= Vineuil =

Vineuil may refer to the following places in France:

- Vineuil, Indre, a commune in the Indre department
- Vineuil, Loir-et-Cher, a commune in the Loir-et-Cher department
