= Sulpicius the Pious =

French bishop and saint

Saint Sulpicius the Pious
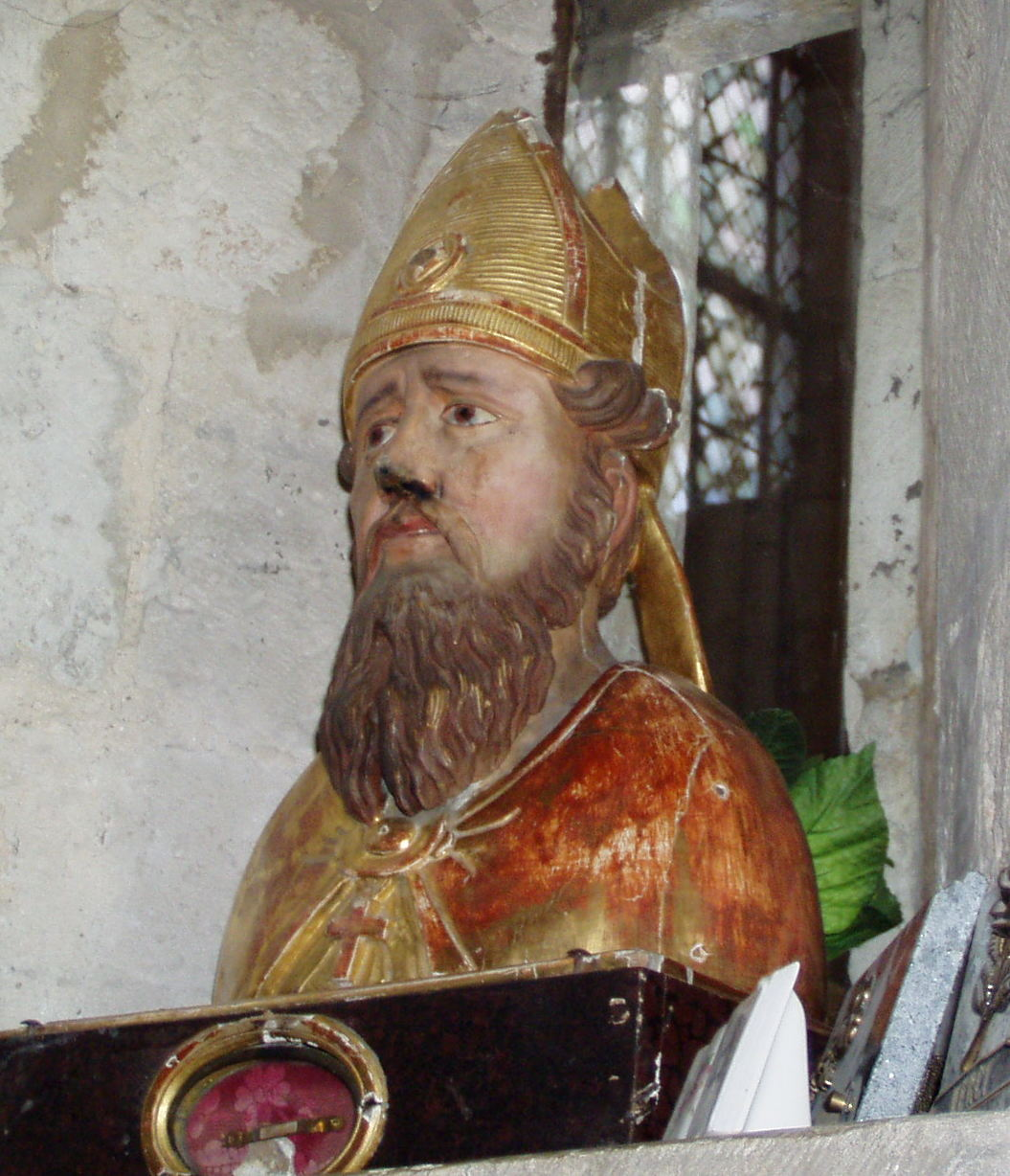
- Reliquary bust of Saint Sulpicius the Pious. Church of Saint-Sulpice-de-Favières.

Bishop, Monastery founder
- Born: c.570 Vatan, Francia
- Died: 17 January 646; Bourges
- Venerated in: Catholic Church; Eastern Orthodox Church
- Major shrine: Saint-Sulpice, Paris
- Feast: 17 January
- Patronage: Vatan, Bourges, late vocations priests, patients with skin problems

Sulpicius II. the Pious (/sʌlˈpɪʃəs/; died 17 January 646) was a 7th-century bishop of Bourges and saint.

== Life ==
According to his Vita, Sulpicius was born at Vatan (Diocese of Bourges), of noble parents, before the end of the sixth century. From his youth he devoted himself to good works and to the study of Scripture, and donated his large patrimony to the Church and the poor.

Austregisilus, Bishop of Bourges, ordained him cleric of his church, then deacon, and finally made him director of his episcopal school. Clotaire II (King of the Franks from 613 to 629), who had heard of his merits, summoned him and made him almoner and chaplain of his armies. Upon the death of Bishop Austregisilus (c. 624) Sulpicious was recalled to Bourges to succeed him. Thenceforth he labored with much zeal and success to re-establish ecclesiastical discipline, for the relief of the poor.

In 627 Sulpicius attended the Council of Clichy and held several others with the bishops of his province. St. Desiderius of Cahors, treasurer to King Clothar II and later Bishop of Cahors, was his personal friend; three letters survive which he addressed to him. In the settings of Vita Sulpicii Episcopi Biturgi, Sulpicius' miracles show him receiving "Theudogisilus", a noble from the palatium of the king with entertainments and a "great heaped fire" (in a fireplace in the centre of the great hall, the smoke issuing through a vent in the roof). Sulpicius allegedly extinguished this fire, when it threatened to get out of control, with the sign of the cross. The vita asserts with approval that "he, the holy man gave leave for no-one, neither heretic, gentile or Jew, to live in the city of Bourges without the grace of baptism" - with many consequent conversions from the Jews of Bourges.

The Vita tells that Dagobert I sent his representative the merciless general Lollo (Lollonius) to reside at Bourges and to bring the city more closely under the king's command. (Note: "that the people of Bourges should at once be placed under law and under him and should live and serve the king’s command." (Sarah Brush, tr.)) Sulpicius intervened with King Dagobert on behalf of his flock, of whom a too heavy tax was exacted. When the people came complaining of their treatment to Sulpicius, he decreed a three-day fast for clergy and laity, but also sent one of his clergy, Ebargisilus by name, to the king, and the tax was remitted.

Towards the end of his life Sulpicius took a coadjutor, Vulfoleudus, (Note: "he asked the king for a partner to support this burden." (Vita, Sarah Brush, tr.)) and retired to a monastery which he had founded near Bourges. There he died on 17 January 646, which day several manuscripts of the Hieronymian Martyrology indicate as his feast. The reports of miracles at his tomb in the basilica he had ordered built began soon after his death and the place became a place of pilgrimage.

That place, the basilica, where the memorable man of God is buried, is called Navis, because the port of ships is seen to be there. It is a most lovely place between two rivers with pastures and woods and vineyards in great number, with fields and rivers flowing between huge plains so that there, the inhabitants may be seen to possess the image of paradise.

== Legacy ==
In his honour the church of Saint-Sulpice was built in Paris, from which the Society of Saint-Sulpice derives its name.

The vita of Sulpicius also contains a vita of his saintly contemporary, Eustadiola.

=== Feast days ===
- 17 January – main commemoration (death anniversary),
- 18 January – main commemoration (Mozarabic Rite),
- 19 January – main commemoration (death anniversary),
- 27 August – translation of his relics from Bourges to Vatan (1757),
