= Saint-Florentin =

Saint-Florentin is the name of 2 communes in France:

- Saint-Florentin, Indre, in the Indre département
- Saint-Florentin, Yonne, in the Yonne département, chief town of the canton of Saint-Florentin
- Saint-florentin (cheese) (in French), soft cheese from canton of Saint-Florentin.
