= AC Mobil 34 =

French aircraft manufacturer

- Company type: Privately held company
- Headquarters: Saint-Florentin, France

AC Mobil 34 is a small French aircraft manufacturer based in Saint-Florentin. The firm produces a light aircraft in kitplane form.

== List of Aircraft ==
- AC Mobil 34 Chrysalin - Single-engine two-seat high-wing monoplane
