= Ménétréols-sous-Vatan =

- Commune
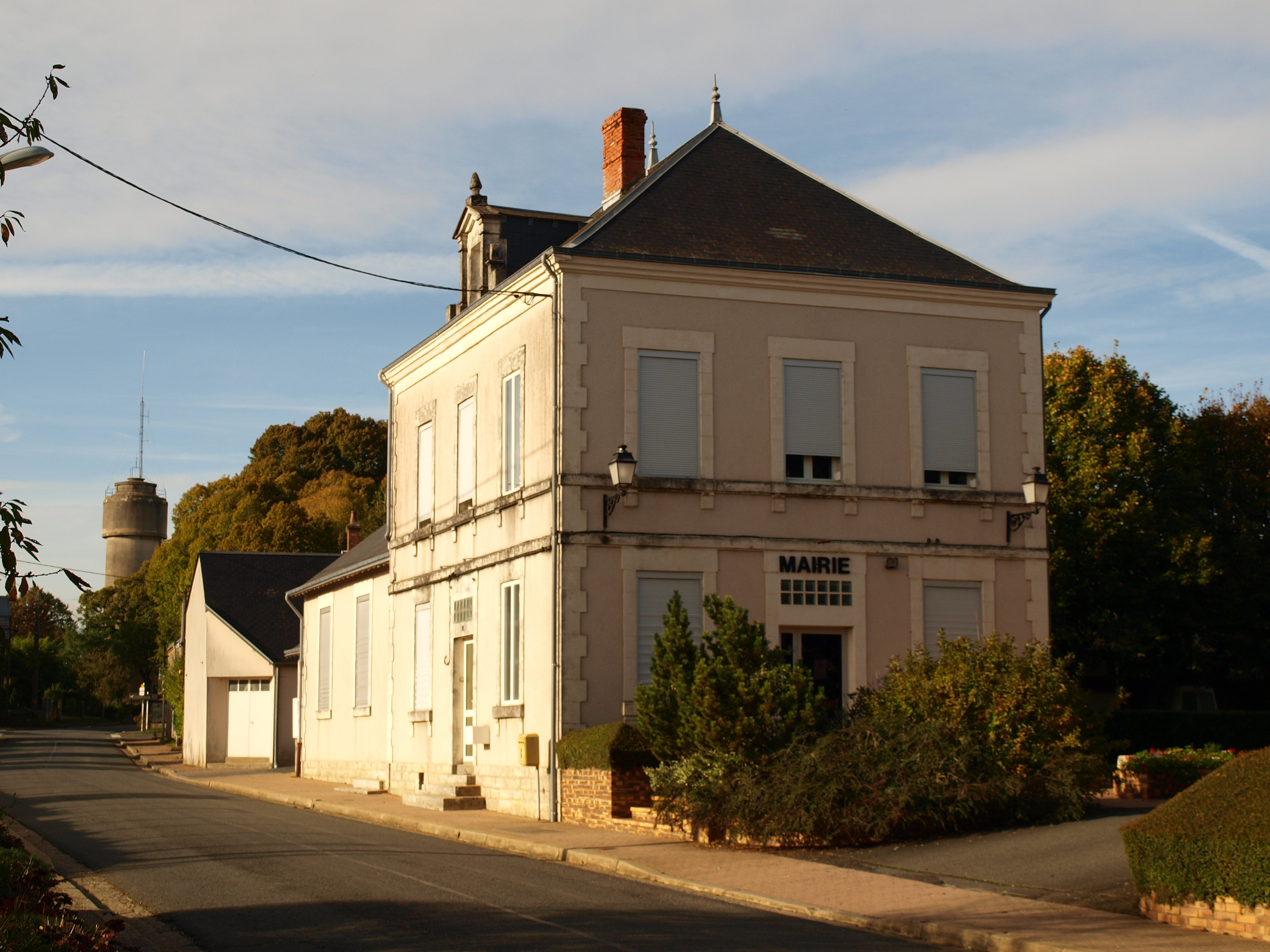
- Town hall
- Location of Ménétréols-sous-Vatan
- Location within France Location within Centre-Val de Loire
- Coordinates: 47°00′58″N 1°50′39″E
- Country: France
- Region: Centre-Val de Loire
- Department: Indre
- Arrondissement: Issoudun
- Canton: Levroux

Government
  - Mayor (2020–2026): Odile Fourré
- Area^{1}: 27.83 km^{2} (10.75 sq mi)
- Elevation: 211 m (692 ft)
- Highest elevation: 221 m (725 ft)
- Lowest elevation: 164 m (538 ft)
- Population (2023): 117
  - Density: 4.20/km^{2} (10.9/sq mi)
- Time zone: UTC+01:00 (CET)
  - Summer (DST): UTC+02:00 (CEST)
- INSEE/Postal code: 36116 /36150
- ^{1} French Land Register data, which excludes lakes, ponds, glaciers > 1 km^{2} (0.386 sq mi or 247 acres) and river estuaries.

Ménétréols-sous-Vatan (French pronunciation: [menetʁeɔl su vatɑ̃], literally Ménétréols under Vatan) is a commune in the Indre department in central France.

== Population ==
Historical population
Year	Pop.	±% p.a.
1968	236	—
1975	170	−4.58%
1982	160	−0.86%
1990	149	−0.89%
1999	124	−2.02%
2007	121	−0.31%
2012	127	+0.97%
2017	118	−1.46%
2023	117	−0.14%
Source: INSEE

== See also ==
- Communes of the Indre department
