= Julien Guertiau =

French World War I flying ace

Julien Anatole Guertiau
- Born: 13 September 1885; Meunet-Planches, France
- Died: 26 April 1954 (aged 68)
- Military career
- Allegiance: France
- Branch: Cavalry; aviation
- Rank: Lieutenant
- Units: 7e Regiment de Hussards; Escadrille 43; Escadrille 97
- Commands: Escadrille 97
- Awards: Legion d'honneur, Medaille militaire, Croix de Guerre, Mentioned in dispatches
- Other work: Served in Indo-China in 1921

Lieutenant Julien Anatole Guertiau (13 September 1885 – 26 April 195) was a cavalryman turned aviator who became a flying ace during World War I. He was credited with eight aerial victories.

== Early life and service ==
Julien Anatole Guertiau was born in Meunet-Planches, France on 13 September 1885. He reported for his mandatory military service in 1907. He was released from active duty as a non-commissioned officer.

== World War I ==
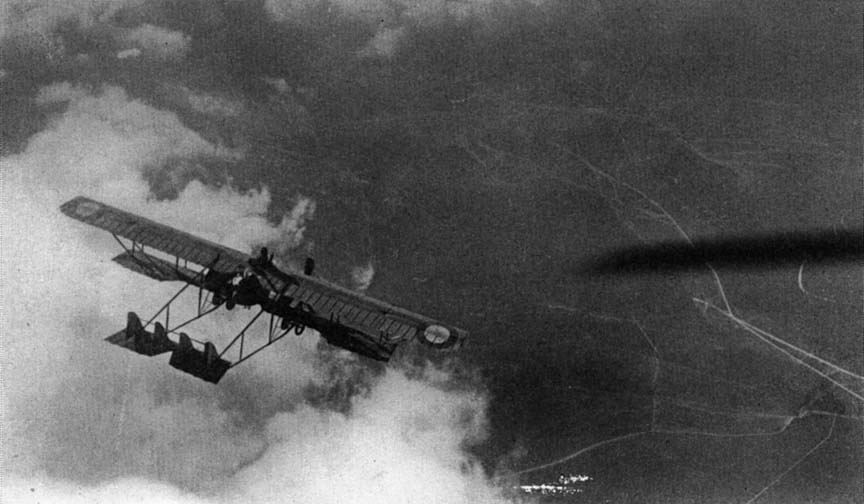
A double motored Caudron flying above the region of Reims (France) about 1917. Julien Guertiau used to fly with a similar aircraft.

On 2 August 1914, he was mobilized from the reserves for military service in World War I. His initial assignment was to the 7e Regiment de Hussards. On 4 November 1915, he transferred to aviation service. After training at Pau, Pyrénées-Atlantiques, he received his military pilot's license, Brevet No. 3036, on 20 March 1916.

After undergoing advanced training, on 23 June 1916 he was assigned to Escadrille C43 as a Caudron pilot. He scored his first aerial victory while flying this model two-seater on 29 September 1916; this win brought him his first mention in dispatches on 29 October. He was then promoted to Adjutant on 21 November 1916.

Rather unusually, he would run his victory string while flying the unwieldy two-seater Caudron to four. His fourth victory, in which his plane was riddled by bullets as he engaged and shot down a German plane attacking a French observation balloon, earned him the Medaille Militaire.

Following these successes, he was retrained as a fighter pilot, beginning on 5 November 1917. He was commissioned as a sous lieutenant on 23 November. On 6 December 1917, he was assigned to Escadrille 97 as a Spad pilot. He would score another four victories while with this squadron. On 9 September 1918, he was awarded the Legion d'honneur. On 25 September, he was promoted to lieutenant. On 3 October, he was appointed to command the squadron.

== List of aerial victories ==
See also Aerial victory standards of World War I

No.	Date/time	Aircraft	Foe	Result	Notes
1	29 September 1916	Caudron	German airplane	Destroyed	Mentioned in dispatches
2	28 April 1917	Caudron	German airplane	Destroyed	Mentioned in dispatches
3	30 May 1917	Caudron	German airplane	Destroyed	Mentioned in dispatches
4	25 June 1917	Caudron	German airplane	Destroyed	Mentioned in dispatches; won Medaille militaire
5	22 January 1918	Spad	Observation balloon	Destroyed	Mentioned in dispatches
6	12 April 1918	Spad	German airplane	Destroyed	
7	28 August 1918	Spad	German airplane	Destroyed	Mentioned in dispatches
8	25 September 1918	Spad	German airplane	Destroyed	

== Post World War I ==
Guertiau went on to serve in French Indo-China in 1921.

Guertiau remained interested in aviation after his return to France. He registered as part owner of a Guerchais-Roche T.12 under designation F-AIYL on 1 March 1929; his home of record was given as Etampes.

Nothing more is known of Julien Anatole Guertiau except that he died on 26 April 1954.
