= Meunet-sur-Vatan =

- Commune
- Location of Meunet-sur-Vatan
- Location within France Location within Centre-Val de Loire
- Coordinates: 47°04′50″N 1°52′00″E
- Country: France
- Region: Centre-Val de Loire
- Department: Indre
- Arrondissement: Issoudun
- Canton: Levroux

Government
  - Mayor (2020–2026): Marie-France Renaudat
- Area^{1}: 12.47 km^{2} (4.81 sq mi)
- Elevation: 140 m (460 ft)
- Highest elevation: 156 m (512 ft)
- Lowest elevation: 109 m (358 ft)
- Population (2023): 198
  - Density: 15.9/km^{2} (41.1/sq mi)
- Time zone: UTC+01:00 (CET)
  - Summer (DST): UTC+02:00 (CEST)
- INSEE/Postal code: 36122 /36150
- ^{1} French Land Register data, which excludes lakes, ponds, glaciers > 1 km^{2} (0.386 sq mi or 247 acres) and river estuaries.

Meunet-sur-Vatan (French pronunciation: [mœnɛ syʁ vatɑ̃], literally Meunet on Vatan) is a commune in the Indre department in central France.

== Population ==
Historical population
Year	Pop.	±% p.a.
1968	246	—
1975	179	−4.44%
1982	161	−1.50%
1990	175	+1.05%
1999	176	+0.06%
2007	192	+1.09%
2012	193	+0.10%
2017	194	+0.10%
2023	198	+0.34%
Source: INSEE

== See also ==
- Communes of the Indre department
