= Rouvres-les-Bois =

- Commune
- Location of Rouvres-les-Bois
- Location within France Location within Centre-Val de Loire
- Coordinates: 47°04′21″N 1°39′23″E
- Country: France
- Region: Centre-Val de Loire
- Department: Indre
- Arrondissement: Châteauroux
- Canton: Levroux
- Intercommunality: CC Levroux Boischaut Champagne

Government
  - Mayor (2020–2026): Jean-Michel Guillemain
- Area^{1}: 30.85 km^{2} (11.91 sq mi)
- Elevation: 150 m (490 ft)
- Highest elevation: 196 m (643 ft)
- Lowest elevation: 113 m (371 ft)
- Population (2023): 281
  - Density: 9.11/km^{2} (23.6/sq mi)
- Time zone: UTC+01:00 (CET)
  - Summer (DST): UTC+02:00 (CEST)
- INSEE/Postal code: 36175 /36110
- ^{1} French Land Register data, which excludes lakes, ponds, glaciers > 1 km^{2} (0.386 sq mi or 247 acres) and river estuaries.

Rouvres-les-Bois (French: [ʁuvʁ le bwa]) is a commune in the Indre department in central France.

== Population ==
Historical population
| Year | Pop. | ±% p.a. |
|---|---|---|
| 1968 | 559 | — |
| 1975 | 478 | −2.21% |
| 1982 | 425 | −1.66% |
| 1990 | 381 | −1.36% |
| 1999 | 361 | −0.60% |
| 2007 | 337 | −0.86% |
| 2012 | 312 | −1.53% |
| 2017 | 286 | −1.73% |
| 2023 | 281 | −0.29% |
Source: INSEE

== See also ==
- Communes of the Indre department
