= Giroux, Indre =

Giroux
- Commune
- Location of Giroux
- Location within France Location within Centre-Val de Loire
- Coordinates: 47°04′03″N 1°54′46″E
- Country: France
- Region: Centre-Val de Loire
- Department: Indre
- Arrondissement: Issoudun
- Canton: Levroux

Government
  - Mayor (2020–2026): Nicole Sauget
- Area^{1}: 23.48 km^{2} (9.07 sq mi)
- Elevation: 150 m (490 ft)
- Highest elevation: 181 m (594 ft)
- Lowest elevation: 133 m (436 ft)
- Population (2023): 121
  - Density: 5.15/km^{2} (13.3/sq mi)
- Time zone: UTC+01:00 (CET)
  - Summer (DST): UTC+02:00 (CEST)
- INSEE/Postal code: 36083 /36150
- ^{1} French Land Register data, which excludes lakes, ponds, glaciers > 1 km^{2} (0.386 sq mi or 247 acres) and river estuaries.

Giroux (French pronunciation: [ʒiʁu]) is a commune in the Indre department in central France.

== Population ==
Historical population
Year	Pop.	±% p.a.
1968	195	—
1975	141	−4.53%
1982	139	−0.20%
1990	138	−0.09%
1999	117	−1.82%
2007	117	+0.00%
2012	122	+0.84%
2017	116	−1.00%
2023	121	+0.71%
Source: INSEE

== See also ==
- Communes of the Indre department
