= Saint-Valentin =

- Commune
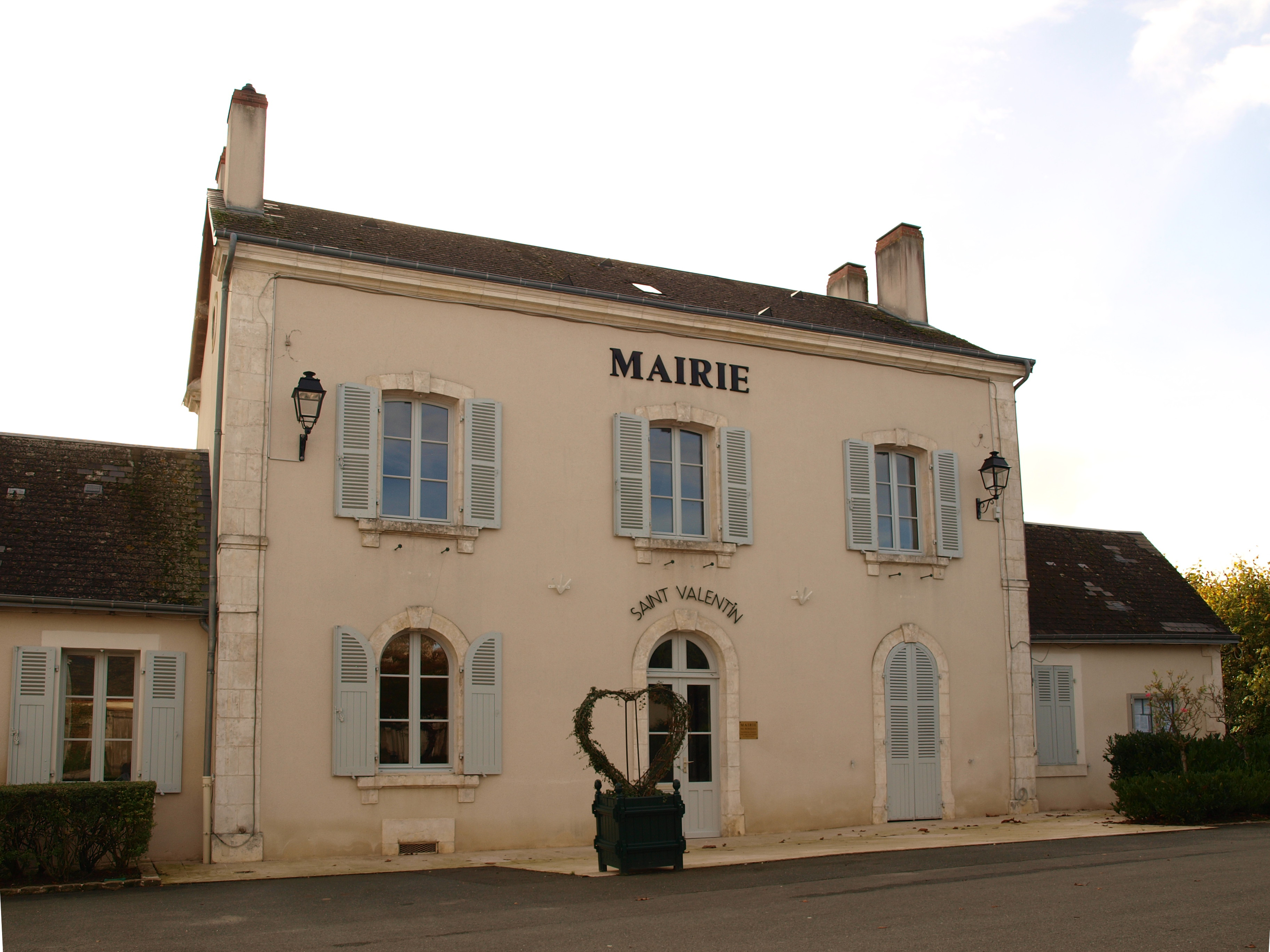
- The town hall in Saint-Valentin
- Location of Saint-Valentin
- Location within France Location within Centre-Val de Loire
- Coordinates: 46°58′35″N 1°51′56″E
- Country: France
- Region: Centre-Val de Loire
- Department: Indre
- Arrondissement: Issoudun
- Canton: Levroux
- Intercommunality: Champagne Boischauts

Government
  - Mayor (2020–2026): Pierre Rousseau
- Area^{1}: 24.9 km^{2} (9.6 sq mi)
- Elevation: 145 m (476 ft)
- Highest elevation: 270 m (890 ft)
- Lowest elevation: 145 m (476 ft)
- Population (2023): 261
  - Density: 10.5/km^{2} (27.1/sq mi)
- Time zone: UTC+01:00 (CET)
  - Summer (DST): UTC+02:00 (CEST)
- INSEE/Postal code: 36209 /37100
- ^{1} French Land Register data, which excludes lakes, ponds, glaciers > 1 km^{2} (0.386 sq mi or 247 acres) and river estuaries.

Saint-Valentin (French pronunciation: [sɛ̃ valɑ̃tɛ̃]) is a commune in the Indre department in central France.

== Population ==
Historical population
Year	Pop.	±% p.a.
1968	305	—
1975	281	−1.16%
1982	258	−1.21%
1990	281	+1.07%
1999	276	−0.20%
2007	270	−0.27%
2012	282	+0.87%
2017	279	−0.21%
2023	261	−1.11%
Source: INSEE

== See also ==
- Communes of the Indre department
