= Villegongis =

- Commune
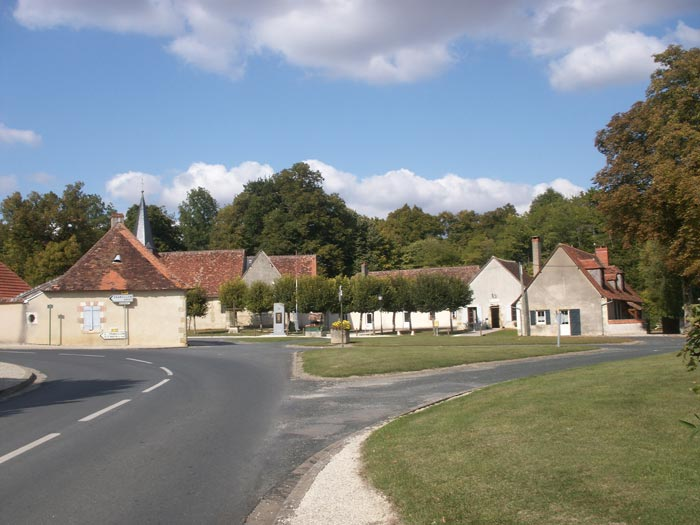
- The centre of Villegongis, with the town hall, the hall, the church, the well and the inn
- Location of Villegongis
- Location within France Location within Centre-Val de Loire
- Coordinates: 46°54′51″N 1°35′47″E
- Country: France
- Region: Centre-Val de Loire
- Department: Indre
- Arrondissement: Châteauroux
- Canton: Levroux
- Intercommunality: CC Levroux Boischaut Champagne

Government
  - Mayor (2020–2026): Jean-Marc Sevault
- Area^{1}: 18.15 km^{2} (7.01 sq mi)
- Elevation: 159 m (522 ft)
- Highest elevation: 196 m (643 ft)
- Lowest elevation: 141 m (463 ft)
- Population (2023): 101
  - Density: 5.56/km^{2} (14.4/sq mi)
- Time zone: UTC+01:00 (CET)
  - Summer (DST): UTC+02:00 (CEST)
- INSEE/Postal code: 36242 /36110
- ^{1} French Land Register data, which excludes lakes, ponds, glaciers > 1 km^{2} (0.386 sq mi or 247 acres) and river estuaries.

Villegongis (French pronunciation: [vilɡɔ̃ʒi]) is a commune in the Indre department in central France.

== Population ==
Historical population
Year	Pop.	±% p.a.
1968	138	—
1975	117	−2.33%
1982	130	+1.52%
1990	111	−1.96%
1999	100	−1.15%
2007	141	+4.39%
2012	133	−1.16%
2017	113	−3.21%
2023	101	−1.85%
Source: INSEE

== See also ==
- Communes of the Indre department
