= Aize =

- Commune
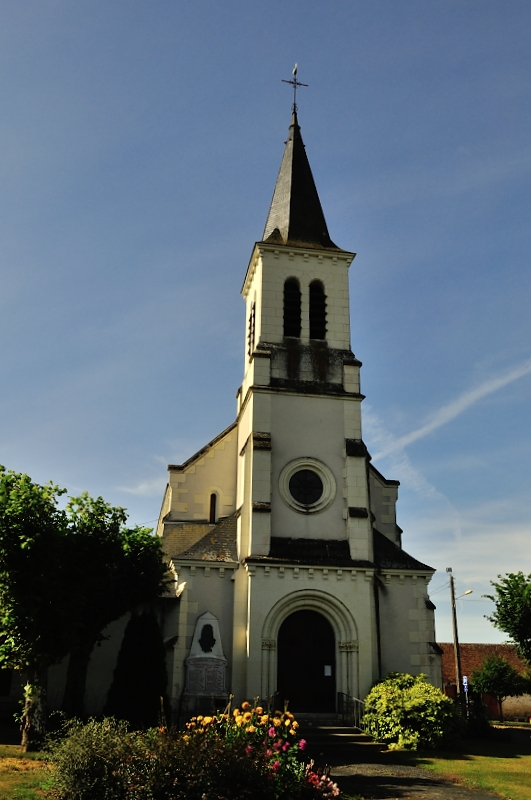
- The church of Saint-Hilaire, in Aize
- Location of Aize
- Location within France Location within Centre-Val de Loire
- Coordinates: 47°06′17″N 1°42′09″E
- Country: France
- Region: Centre-Val de Loire
- Department: Indre
- Arrondissement: Issoudun
- Canton: Levroux
- Intercommunality: Champagne Boischauts

Government
  - Mayor (2020–2026): Michel Chevallet
- Area^{1}: 17.07 km^{2} (6.59 sq mi)
- Elevation: 121 m (397 ft)
- Highest elevation: 161 m (528 ft)
- Lowest elevation: 100 m (330 ft)
- Population (2023): 114
  - Density: 6.68/km^{2} (17.3/sq mi)
- Time zone: UTC+01:00 (CET)
  - Summer (DST): UTC+02:00 (CEST)
- INSEE/Postal code: 36002 /36150
- ^{1} French Land Register data, which excludes lakes, ponds, glaciers > 1 km^{2} (0.386 sq mi or 247 acres) and river estuaries.

Aize (French pronunciation: [ɛz]) is a commune in the Indre department, central France.

== Population ==
Historical population
Year	Pop.	±% p.a.
1968	200	—
1975	169	−2.38%
1982	164	−0.43%
1990	131	−2.77%
1999	126	−0.43%
2007	127	+0.10%
2012	124	−0.48%
2017	116	−1.32%
2023	114	−0.29%
Source: INSEE

== See also ==
- Communes of the Indre department
