= La Chapelle-Saint-Laurian =

- Commune
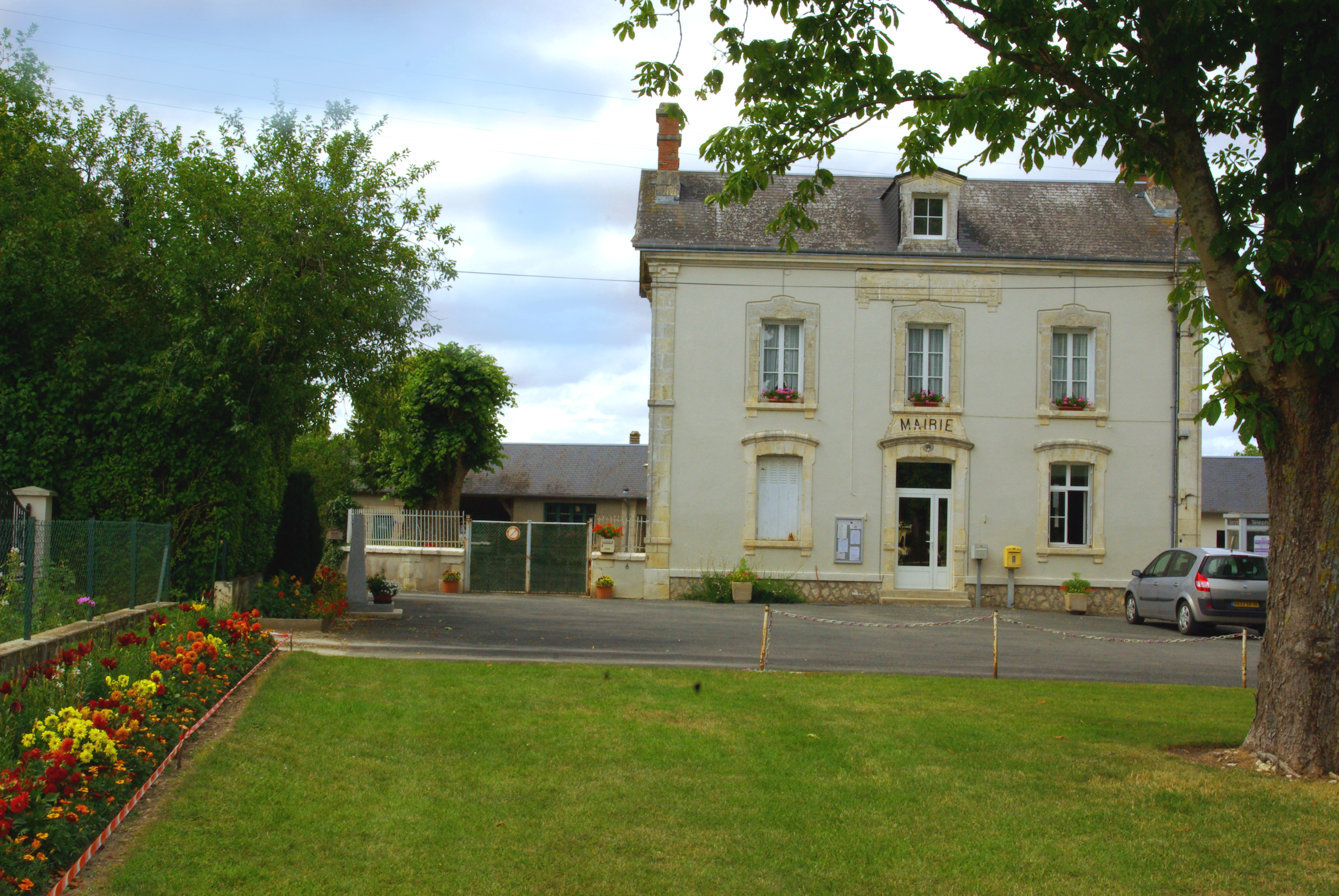
- Town hall
- Location of La Chapelle-Saint-Laurian
- Location within France Location within Centre-Val de Loire
- Coordinates: 47°03′47″N 1°47′02″E
- Country: France
- Region: Centre-Val de Loire
- Department: Indre
- Arrondissement: Issoudun
- Canton: Levroux

Government
  - Mayor (2020–2026): Sylvain Auger
- Area^{1}: 9.82 km^{2} (3.79 sq mi)
- Elevation: 200 m (660 ft)
- Highest elevation: 174 m (571 ft)
- Lowest elevation: 125 m (410 ft)
- Population (2023): 135
  - Density: 13.7/km^{2} (35.6/sq mi)
- Time zone: UTC+01:00 (CET)
  - Summer (DST): UTC+02:00 (CEST)
- INSEE/Postal code: 36041 /36150
- ^{1} French Land Register data, which excludes lakes, ponds, glaciers > 1 km^{2} (0.386 sq mi or 247 acres) and river estuaries.

La Chapelle-Saint-Laurian (French pronunciation: [la ʃapɛl sɛ̃ loʁjɑ̃]) is a commune in the Indre department in central France.

== Population ==
Historical population
Year	Pop.	±% p.a.
1968	162	—
1975	140	−2.06%
1982	162	+2.11%
1990	135	−2.25%
1999	141	+0.48%
2007	144	+0.26%
2012	133	−1.58%
2017	148	+2.16%
2023	135	−1.52%
Source: INSEE

== See also ==
- Communes of the Indre department
