= Saint-Pierre-de-Jards =

- Commune
- Location of Saint-Pierre-de-Jards
- Location within France Location within Centre-Val de Loire
- Coordinates: 47°05′54″N 1°58′03″E
- Country: France
- Region: Centre-Val de Loire
- Department: Indre
- Arrondissement: Issoudun
- Canton: Levroux
- Intercommunality: Champagne Boischauts

Government
  - Mayor (2020–2026): Alain Bardey
- Area^{1}: 18.01 km^{2} (6.95 sq mi)
- Elevation: 144 m (472 ft)
- Highest elevation: 154 m (505 ft)
- Lowest elevation: 114 m (374 ft)
- Population (2023): 96
  - Density: 5.3/km^{2} (14/sq mi)
- Time zone: UTC+01:00 (CET)
  - Summer (DST): UTC+02:00 (CEST)
- INSEE/Postal code: 36205 /36260
- ^{1} French Land Register data, which excludes lakes, ponds, glaciers > 1 km^{2} (0.386 sq mi or 247 acres) and river estuaries.

Saint-Pierre-de-Jards (French pronunciation: [sɛ̃ pjɛʁ də ʒaʁ]) is a commune in the Indre department in central France.

== Population ==
Historical population
Year	Pop.	±% p.a.
1968	239	—
1975	221	−1.11%
1982	157	−4.77%
1990	135	−1.87%
1999	137	+0.16%
2007	126	−1.04%
2012	109	−2.86%
2017	122	+2.28%
2023	96	−3.92%
Source: INSEE

== See also ==
- Communes of the Indre department
