= Liniez =

- Commune
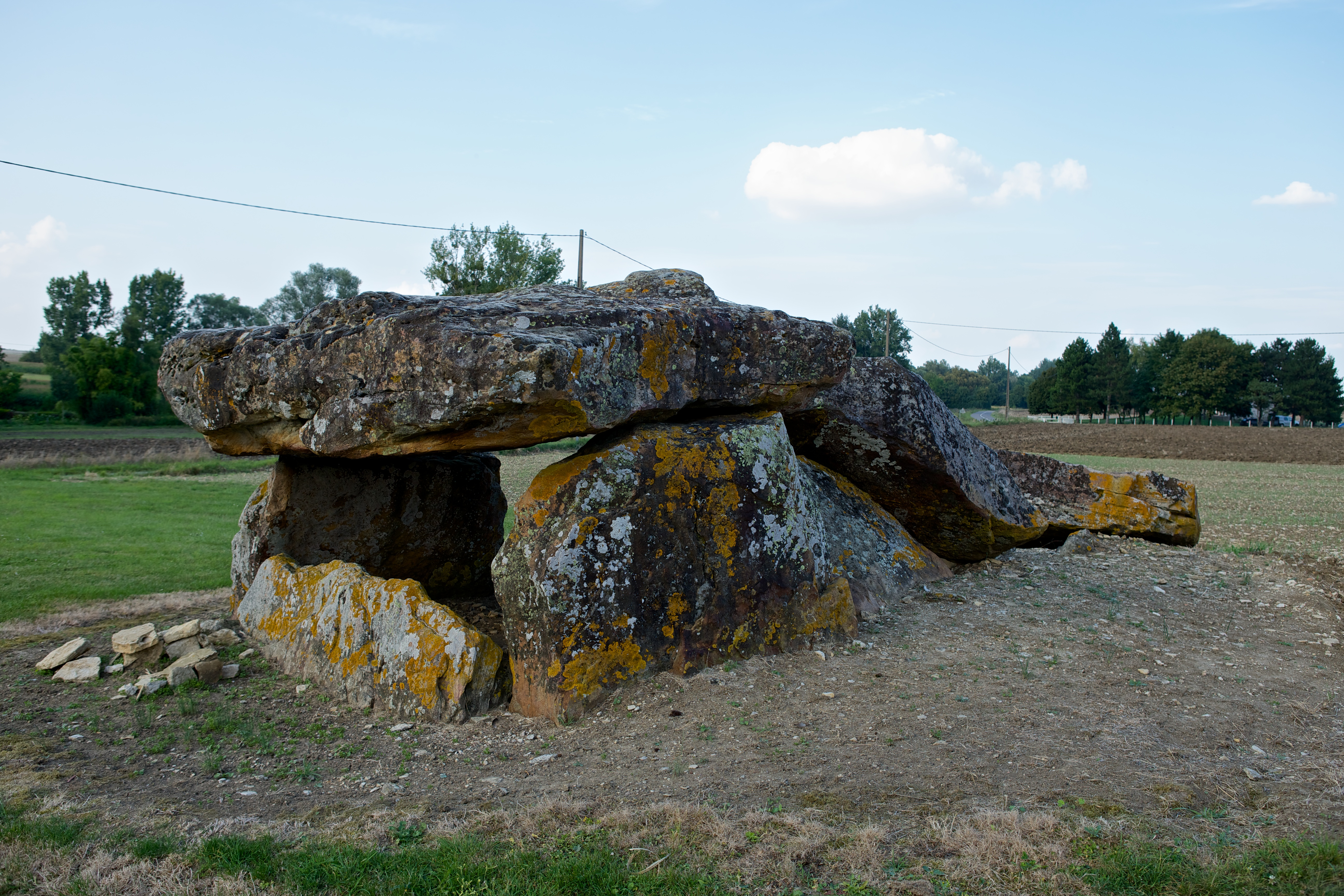
- The Dolmen of Liniez
- Location of Liniez
- Location within France Location within Centre-Val de Loire
- Coordinates: 47°01′29″N 1°45′08″E
- Country: France
- Region: Centre-Val de Loire
- Department: Indre
- Arrondissement: Issoudun
- Canton: Levroux
- Intercommunality: Champagne Boischauts

Government
  - Mayor (2020–2026): Alain Tissier
- Area^{1}: 26.94 km^{2} (10.40 sq mi)
- Elevation: 150 m (490 ft)
- Highest elevation: 216 m (709 ft)
- Lowest elevation: 139 m (456 ft)
- Population (2023): 328
  - Density: 12.2/km^{2} (31.5/sq mi)
- Time zone: UTC+01:00 (CET)
  - Summer (DST): UTC+02:00 (CEST)
- INSEE/Postal code: 36097 /36150
- ^{1} French Land Register data, which excludes lakes, ponds, glaciers > 1 km^{2} (0.386 sq mi or 247 acres) and river estuaries.

Liniez (French pronunciation: [linje]) is a commune in the Indre department in central France.

== Population ==
Historical population
Year	Pop.	±% p.a.
1968	523	—
1975	423	−2.99%
1982	367	−2.01%
1990	339	−0.99%
1999	305	−1.17%
2007	314	+0.36%
2012	343	+1.78%
2017	325	−1.07%
2023	328	+0.15%
Source: INSEE

== See also ==
- Communes of the Indre department
