= Brion, Indre =

Brion
- Commune
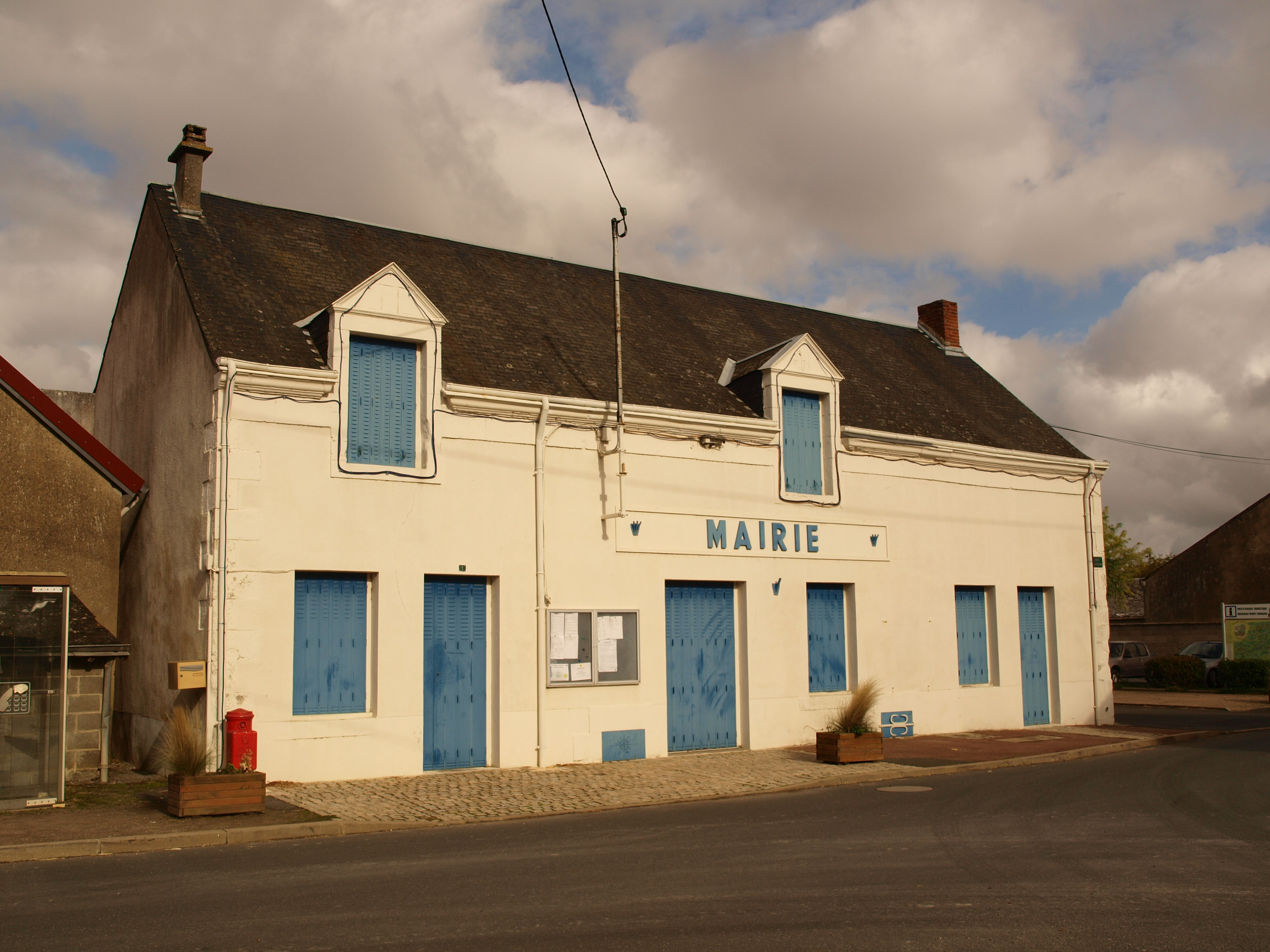
- The town hall in Brion
- Location of Brion
- Location within France Location within Centre-Val de Loire
- Coordinates: 46°57′28″N 1°43′42″E
- Country: France
- Region: Centre-Val de Loire
- Department: Indre
- Arrondissement: Châteauroux
- Canton: Levroux
- Intercommunality: CC Levroux Boischaut Champagne

Government
  - Mayor (2020–2026): Thierry Fourré
- Area^{1}: 44.2 km^{2} (17.1 sq mi)
- Elevation: 180 m (590 ft)
- Highest elevation: 222 m (728 ft)
- Lowest elevation: 158 m (518 ft)
- Population (2023): 582
  - Density: 13.2/km^{2} (34.1/sq mi)
- Time zone: UTC+01:00 (CET)
  - Summer (DST): UTC+02:00 (CEST)
- INSEE/Postal code: 36026 /36110
- ^{1} French Land Register data, which excludes lakes, ponds, glaciers > 1 km^{2} (0.386 sq mi or 247 acres) and river estuaries.

Brion (French pronunciation: [bʁijɔ̃]) is a commune in the Indre department in central France.

== Population ==
Historical population
| Year | Pop. | ±% p.a. |
|---|---|---|
| 1968 | 680 | — |
| 1975 | 585 | −2.13% |
| 1982 | 598 | +0.31% |
| 1990 | 496 | −2.31% |
| 1999 | 440 | −1.32% |
| 2007 | 487 | +1.28% |
| 2012 | 510 | +0.93% |
| 2017 | 572 | +2.32% |
| 2023 | 582 | +0.29% |
Source: INSEE

== See also ==
- Communes of the Indre department
