= Baudres =

- Commune
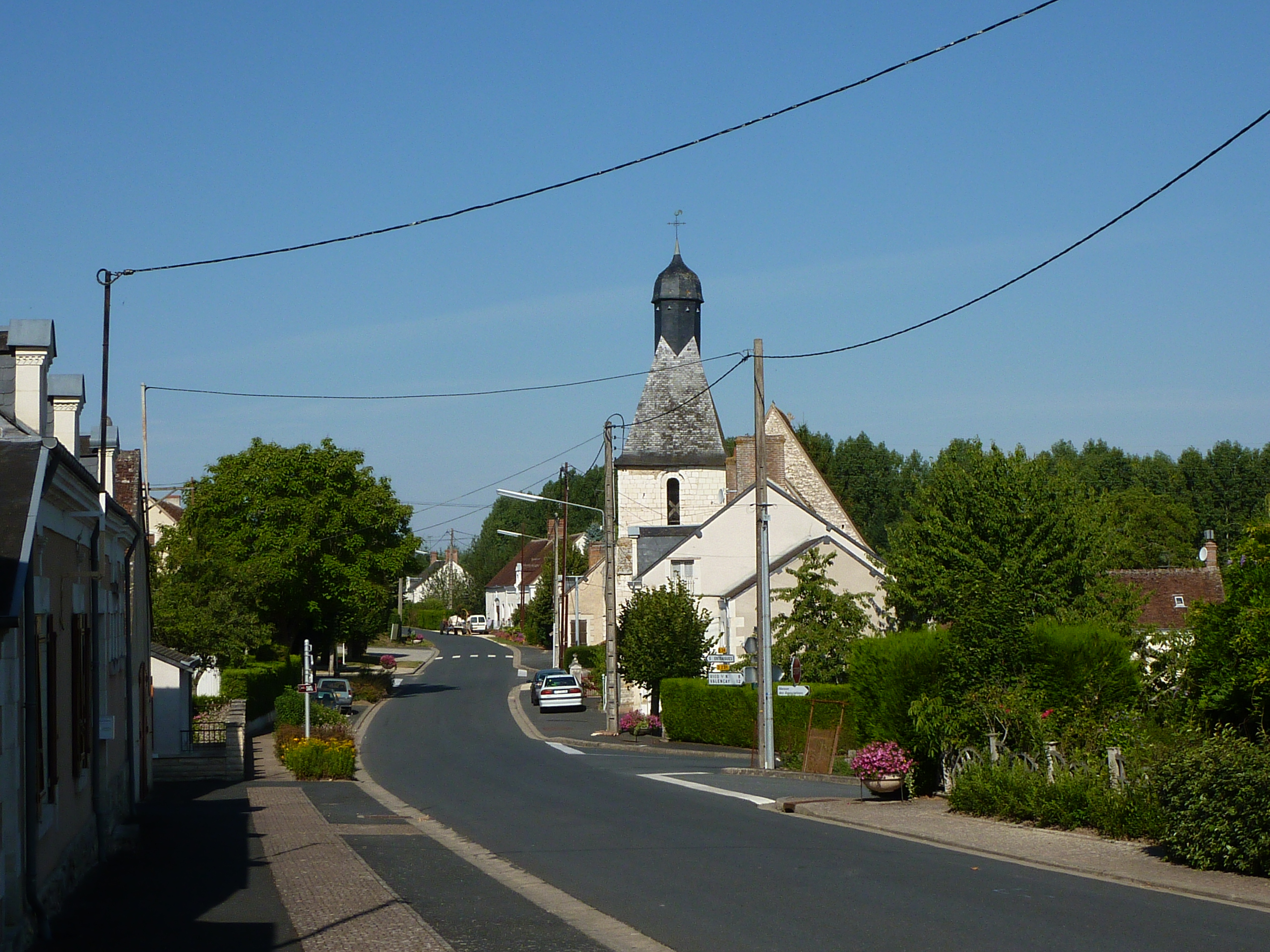
- The church and the main road in the centre of Baudres
- Location of Baudres
- Location within France Location within Centre-Val de Loire
- Coordinates: 47°03′30″N 1°34′45″E
- Country: France
- Region: Centre-Val de Loire
- Department: Indre
- Arrondissement: Châteauroux
- Canton: Levroux
- Intercommunality: CC Levroux Boischaut Champagne

Government
  - Mayor (2020–2026): Bruno Lessault
- Area^{1}: 27.4 km^{2} (10.6 sq mi)
- Elevation: 80 m (260 ft)
- Highest elevation: 206 m (676 ft)
- Lowest elevation: 110 m (360 ft)
- Population (2023): 397
  - Density: 14.5/km^{2} (37.5/sq mi)
- Time zone: UTC+01:00 (CET)
  - Summer (DST): UTC+02:00 (CEST)
- INSEE/Postal code: 36013 /36110
- ^{1} French Land Register data, which excludes lakes, ponds, glaciers > 1 km^{2} (0.386 sq mi or 247 acres) and river estuaries.

Baudres (French pronunciation: [bodʁ]) is a commune in the Indre département in central France.

== Population ==
Historical population
Year	Pop.	±% p.a.
1968	655	—
1975	585	−1.60%
1982	561	−0.60%
1990	507	−1.26%
1999	495	−0.27%
2007	509	+0.35%
2012	462	−1.92%
2017	438	−1.06%
2023	397	−1.62%
Source: INSEE

== See also ==
- Communes of the Indre department
