= Sainte-Lizaigne =

- Commune
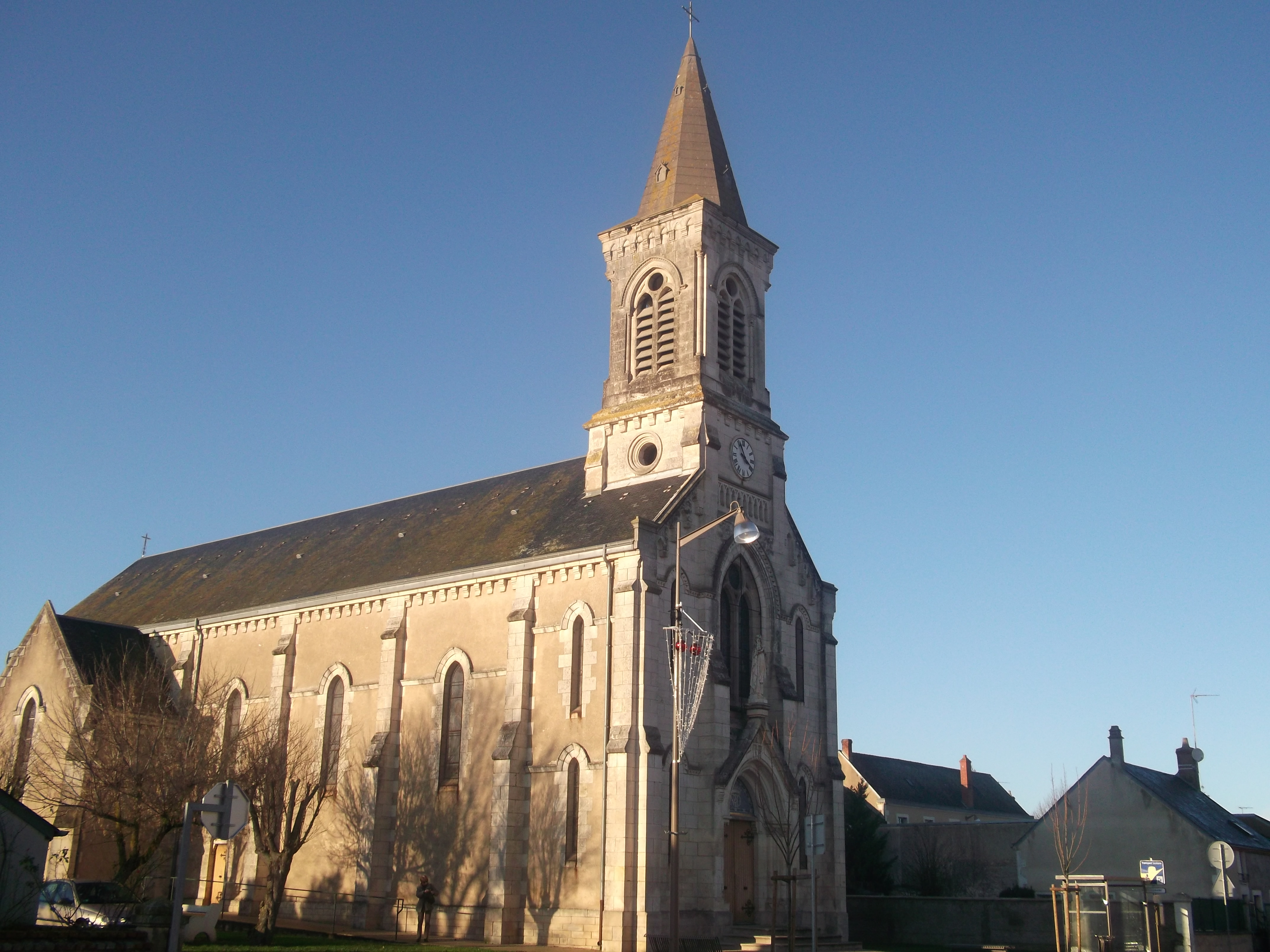
- The Church of Notre-Dame-de-Lourdes, in Sainte-Lizaigne

- Coat of arms
- Location of Sainte-Lizaigne
- Location within France Location within Centre-Val de Loire
- Coordinates: 47°00′28″N 2°01′25″E
- Country: France
- Region: Centre-Val de Loire
- Department: Indre
- Arrondissement: Issoudun
- Canton: Levroux
- Intercommunality: CC Pays d'Issoudun

Government
  - Mayor (2020–2026): Pascal Pauvrehomme
- Area^{1}: 26.36 km^{2} (10.18 sq mi)
- Elevation: 128 m (420 ft)
- Highest elevation: 171 m (561 ft)
- Lowest elevation: 115 m (377 ft)
- Population (2023): 1,101
  - Density: 41.77/km^{2} (108.2/sq mi)
- Time zone: UTC+01:00 (CET)
  - Summer (DST): UTC+02:00 (CEST)
- INSEE/Postal code: 36199 /36260
- ^{1} French Land Register data, which excludes lakes, ponds, glaciers > 1 km^{2} (0.386 sq mi or 247 acres) and river estuaries.

Sainte-Lizaigne is a commune in the Indre department in central France.

== Population ==
Historical population
Year	Pop.	±% p.a.
1968	821	—
1975	816	−0.09%
1982	1,002	+2.98%
1990	1,109	+1.28%
1999	1,160	+0.50%
2007	1,220	+0.63%
2012	1,221	+0.02%
2017	1,176	−0.75%
2023	1,101	−1.09%
Source: INSEE

== See also ==
- Communes of the Indre department
