= Reboursin =

- Commune
- Location of Reboursin
- Location within France Location within Centre-Val de Loire
- Coordinates: 47°06′27″N 1°49′19″E
- Country: France
- Region: Centre-Val de Loire
- Department: Indre
- Arrondissement: Issoudun
- Canton: Levroux

Government
  - Mayor (2020–2026): Éric Van Remoortere
- Area^{1}: 12.72 km^{2} (4.91 sq mi)
- Elevation: 100 m (330 ft)
- Highest elevation: 160 m (520 ft)
- Lowest elevation: 108 m (354 ft)
- Population (2023): 102
  - Density: 8.02/km^{2} (20.8/sq mi)
- Time zone: UTC+01:00 (CET)
  - Summer (DST): UTC+02:00 (CEST)
- INSEE/Postal code: 36170 /36150
- ^{1} French Land Register data, which excludes lakes, ponds, glaciers > 1 km^{2} (0.386 sq mi or 247 acres) and river estuaries.

Reboursin (French pronunciation: [ʁəbuʁsɛ̃]) is a commune in the Indre department in central France.

== Population ==
Historical population
Year	Pop.	±% p.a.
1968	131	—
1975	103	−3.38%
1982	109	+0.81%
1990	101	−0.95%
1999	98	−0.33%
2007	113	+1.80%
2012	124	+1.88%
2017	109	−2.55%
2023	102	−1.10%
Source: INSEE

== See also ==
- Communes of the Indre department
