= Francillon =

- Commune
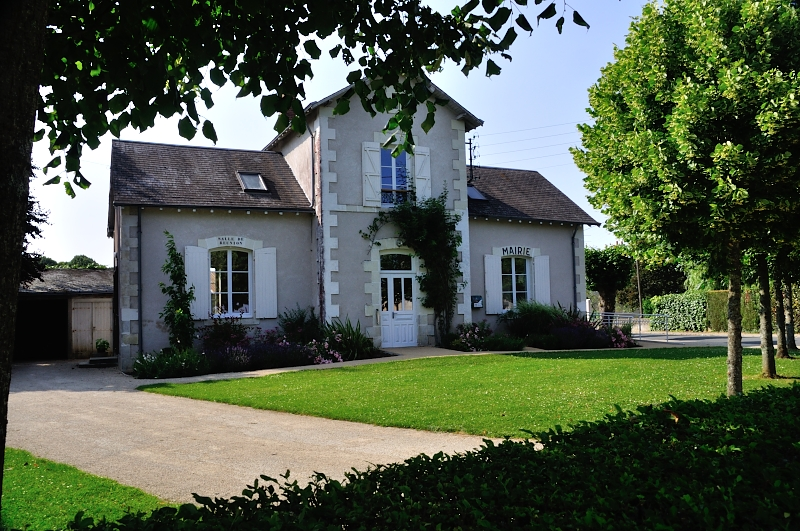
- The town hall in Francillon
- Location of Francillon
- Location within France Location within Centre-Val de Loire
- Coordinates: 46°56′33″N 1°33′46″E
- Country: France
- Region: Centre-Val de Loire
- Department: Indre
- Arrondissement: Châteauroux
- Canton: Levroux
- Intercommunality: CC Levroux Boischaut Champagne

Government
  - Mayor (2020–2026): Michel Lavenu
- Area^{1}: 10.27 km^{2} (3.97 sq mi)
- Elevation: 185 m (607 ft)
- Highest elevation: 194 m (636 ft)
- Lowest elevation: 144 m (472 ft)
- Population (2023): 75
  - Density: 7.3/km^{2} (19/sq mi)
- Time zone: UTC+01:00 (CET)
  - Summer (DST): UTC+02:00 (CEST)
- INSEE/Postal code: 36079 /36110
- ^{1} French Land Register data, which excludes lakes, ponds, glaciers > 1 km^{2} (0.386 sq mi or 247 acres) and river estuaries.

Francillon (French pronunciation: [fʁɑ̃sijɔ̃]) is a commune in the Indre department in central France.

== Population ==
Historical population
Year	Pop.	±% p.a.
1968	110	—
1975	100	−1.35%
1982	72	−4.58%
1990	63	−1.66%
1999	72	+1.49%
2007	73	+0.17%
2012	71	−0.55%
2017	78	+1.90%
2023	75	−0.65%
Source: INSEE

== See also ==
- Communes of the Indre department
