= La Champenoise =

- Commune
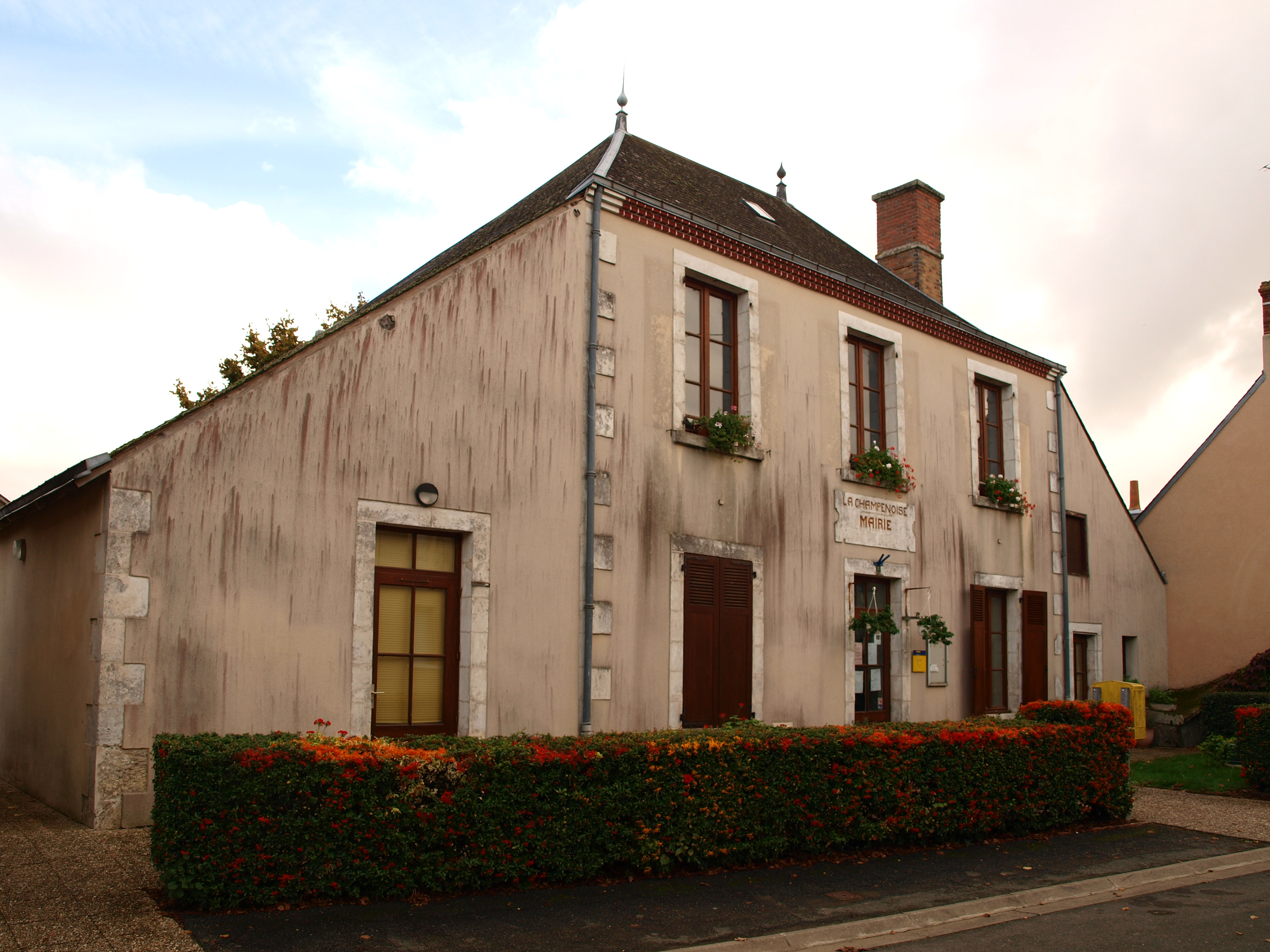
- The town hall in La Champenoise
- Location of La Champenoise
- Location within France Location within Centre-Val de Loire
- Coordinates: 46°56′27″N 1°48′09″E
- Country: France
- Region: Centre-Val de Loire
- Department: Indre
- Arrondissement: Issoudun
- Canton: Levroux

Government
  - Mayor (2020–2026): Christian Favreau
- Area^{1}: 44.34 km^{2} (17.12 sq mi)
- Elevation: 176 m (577 ft)
- Highest elevation: 216 m (709 ft)
- Lowest elevation: 152 m (499 ft)
- Population (2023): 310
  - Density: 7.0/km^{2} (18/sq mi)
- Time zone: UTC+01:00 (CET)
  - Summer (DST): UTC+02:00 (CEST)
- INSEE/Postal code: 36037 /36100
- ^{1} French Land Register data, which excludes lakes, ponds, glaciers > 1 km^{2} (0.386 sq mi or 247 acres) and river estuaries.

La Champenoise (French pronunciation: [la ʃɑ̃pnwaz]) is a commune in the Indre department in central France.

== Population ==
Historical population
Year	Pop.	±% p.a.
1968	489	—
1975	392	−3.11%
1982	335	−2.22%
1990	261	−3.07%
1999	250	−0.48%
2007	301	+2.35%
2012	321	+1.29%
2017	268	−3.54%
2023	310	+2.46%
Source: INSEE

== See also ==
- Communes of the Indre department
