= Lizeray =

- Commune
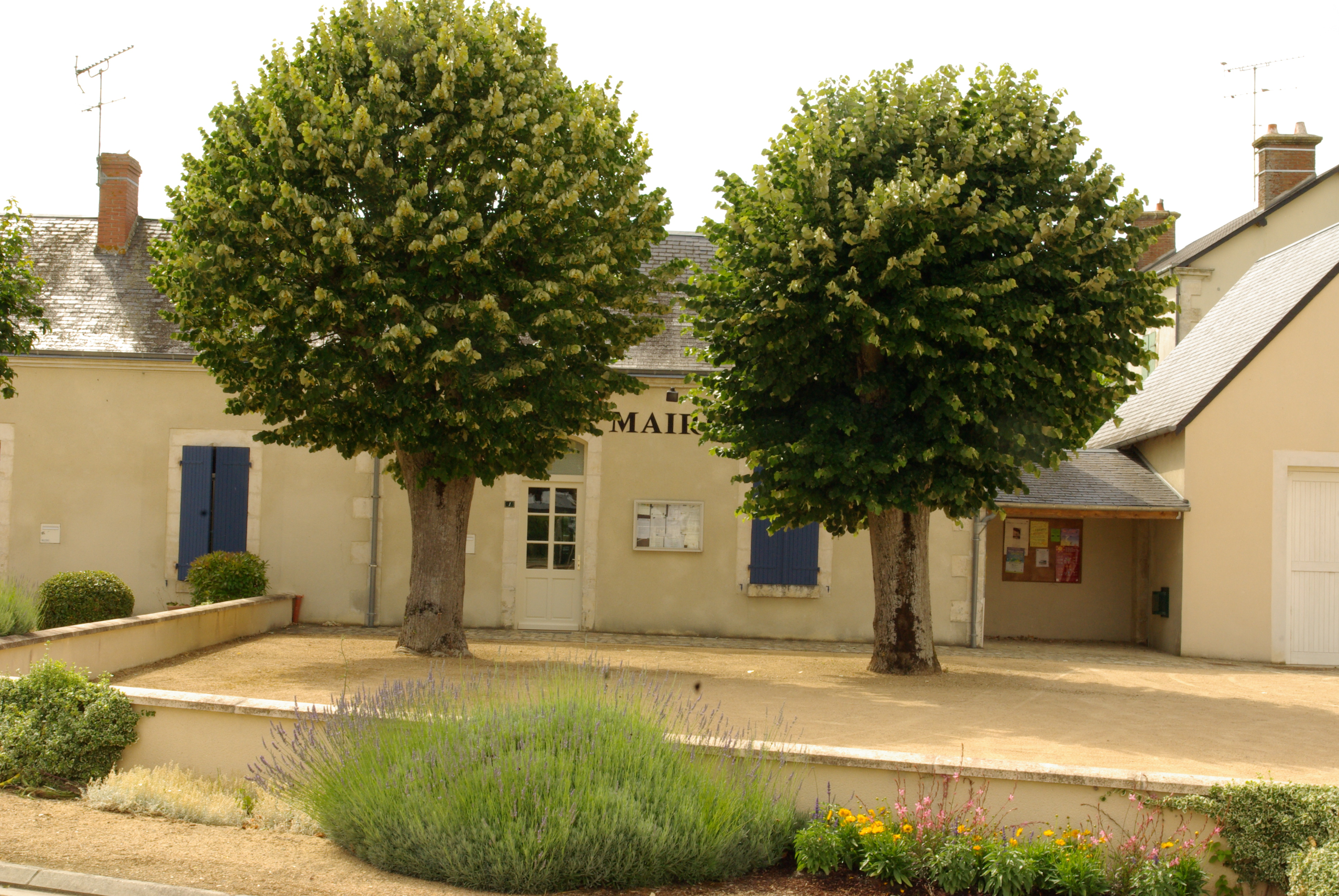
- Town hall

- Coat of arms
- Location of Lizeray
- Location within France Location within Centre-Val de Loire
- Coordinates: 46°58′58″N 1°54′23″E
- Country: France
- Region: Centre-Val de Loire
- Department: Indre
- Arrondissement: Issoudun
- Canton: Levroux
- Intercommunality: Champagne Boischauts

Government
  - Mayor (2020–2026): Pascal Morin
- Area^{1}: 35.41 km^{2} (13.67 sq mi)
- Elevation: 155 m (509 ft)
- Highest elevation: 188 m (617 ft)
- Lowest elevation: 140 m (460 ft)
- Population (2023): 81
  - Density: 2.3/km^{2} (5.9/sq mi)
- Time zone: UTC+01:00 (CET)
  - Summer (DST): UTC+02:00 (CEST)
- INSEE/Postal code: 36098 /36100
- ^{1} French Land Register data, which excludes lakes, ponds, glaciers > 1 km^{2} (0.386 sq mi or 247 acres) and river estuaries.

Lizeray (French pronunciation: [lizʁɛ]) is a commune in the Indre department in central France.

== Population ==
Historical population
Year	Pop.	±% p.a.
1968	174	—
1975	158	−1.37%
1982	124	−3.40%
1990	102	−2.41%
1999	100	−0.22%
2007	108	+0.97%
2012	102	−1.14%
2017	82	−4.27%
2023	81	−0.20%
Source: INSEE

== See also ==
- Communes of the Indre department
