= Saint-Sulpice-de-Favières =

Commune in Île-de-France, France

- Commune
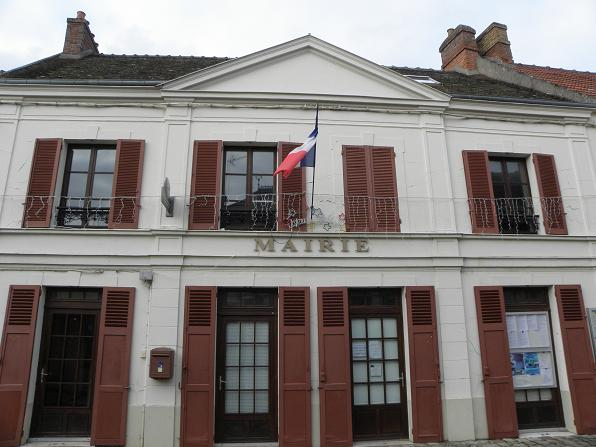
- The town hall in Saint-Sulpice-de-Favières
- Location of Saint-Sulpice-de-Favières
- Location within France Location within Île-de-France (region)
- Coordinates: 48°32′28″N 2°10′41″E
- Country: France
- Region: Île-de-France
- Department: Essonne
- Arrondissement: Étampes
- Canton: Dourdan
- Intercommunality: Entre Juine et Renarde

Government
  - Mayor (2020–2026): Olivier Petrilli
- Area^{1}: 4.37 km^{2} (1.69 sq mi)
- Highest elevation: 159 m (522 ft)
- Lowest elevation: 62 m (203 ft)
- Population (2023): 272
  - Density: 62.2/km^{2} (161/sq mi)
- Time zone: UTC+01:00 (CET)
  - Summer (DST): UTC+02:00 (CEST)
- INSEE/Postal code: 91578 /91910
- ^{1} French Land Register data, which excludes lakes, ponds, glaciers > 1 km^{2} (0.386 sq mi or 247 acres) and river estuaries.

Saint-Sulpice-de-Favières (French pronunciation: [sɛ̃ sylpis də favjɛʁ]) is a commune in the Essonne department in Île-de-France in northern France, located in the metropolitan area of Paris.

Inhabitants of Saint-Sulpice-de-Favières are known as Saint-Sulpiciens.

== Geography ==
Saint-Sulpice-de-Favières is located in the Renarde valley, 35 km (22 mi) South of Paris.

== History ==
The previous name of the village is Favières from the Old French faveriis which itself is derived from the Latin fava (broad bean) meaning broad bean field.

== Monuments ==
=== Saint-Sulpice church ===
The church was built during the 13th century and 14th century and is dedicated to Sulpice the Pious (ca 576–647), bishop of Bourges.

=== Segrez manor-house ===
The manor-house was built during the 18th century and hosted in 1884 one of the biggest arboretums of its time, the Arboretum de Segrez, with more than 6500 species of tree.

== See also ==
- Communes of the Essonne department
