= Moulins-sur-Céphons =

- Commune
- Location of Moulins-sur-Céphons
- Location within France Location within Centre-Val de Loire
- Coordinates: 47°00′40″N 1°33′26″E
- Country: France
- Region: Centre-Val de Loire
- Department: Indre
- Arrondissement: Châteauroux
- Canton: Levroux
- Intercommunality: CC Levroux Boischaut Champagne

Government
  - Mayor (2020–2026): Jean-Pierre Chêne
- Area^{1}: 32.17 km^{2} (12.42 sq mi)
- Elevation: 125 m (410 ft)
- Highest elevation: 203 m (666 ft)
- Lowest elevation: 117 m (384 ft)
- Population (2023): 277
  - Density: 8.61/km^{2} (22.3/sq mi)
- Time zone: UTC+01:00 (CET)
  - Summer (DST): UTC+02:00 (CEST)
- INSEE/Postal code: 36135 /36110
- ^{1} French Land Register data, which excludes lakes, ponds, glaciers > 1 km^{2} (0.386 sq mi or 247 acres) and river estuaries.

Moulins-sur-Céphons (French pronunciation: [mulɛ̃ syʁ sefɔ̃]) is a commune in the Indre department in central France. It is located some 6 km to the northwest of the town of Levroux.

The village has a medieval motte at its centre, dating from circa 1050.

The pioneering railway engineer Eugène Flaman was born in Moulins-sur-Céphons.

== Population ==
Historical population
Year	Pop.	±% p.a.
1968	493	—
1975	434	−1.80%
1982	401	−1.12%
1990	356	−1.48%
1999	320	−1.18%
2007	335	+0.57%
2012	318	−1.04%
2017	293	−1.62%
2023	277	−0.93%
Source: INSEE

== See also ==
- Communes of the Indre department
