= Paudy =

- Commune
- Location of Paudy
- Location within France Location within Centre-Val de Loire
- Coordinates: 47°02′20″N 1°55′10″E
- Country: France
- Region: Centre-Val de Loire
- Department: Indre
- Arrondissement: Issoudun
- Canton: Levroux
- Intercommunality: CC Pays d'Issoudun

Government
  - Mayor (2020–2026): Agathe Nivet
- Area^{1}: 30.28 km^{2} (11.69 sq mi)
- Elevation: 140 m (460 ft)
- Highest elevation: 187 m (614 ft)
- Lowest elevation: 139 m (456 ft)
- Population (2023): 437
  - Density: 14.4/km^{2} (37.4/sq mi)
- Time zone: UTC+01:00 (CET)
  - Summer (DST): UTC+02:00 (CEST)
- INSEE/Postal code: 36152 /36260
- ^{1} French Land Register data, which excludes lakes, ponds, glaciers > 1 km^{2} (0.386 sq mi or 247 acres) and river estuaries.

Paudy (French pronunciation: [podi]) is a commune in the Indre department in central France.

== Population ==
Historical population
Year	Pop.	±% p.a.
1968	697	—
1975	593	−2.28%
1982	504	−2.30%
1990	445	−1.54%
1999	435	−0.25%
2007	458	+0.65%
2012	486	+1.19%
2017	452	−1.44%
2023	437	−0.56%
Source: INSEE

== See also ==
- Communes of the Indre department
