= Bretagne, Indre =

Bretagne
- Commune
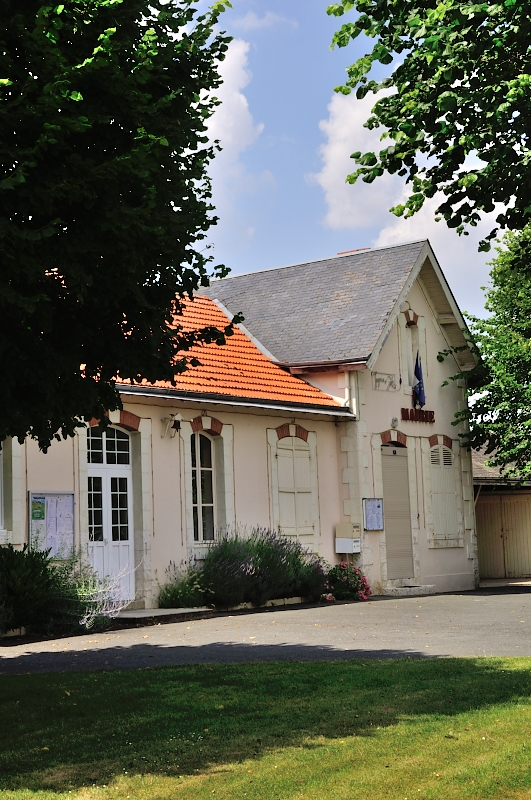
- The town hall in Bretagne

- Coat of arms
- Location of Bretagne
- Location within France Location within Centre-Val de Loire
- Coordinates: 47°00′13″N 1°40′53″E
- Country: France
- Region: Centre-Val de Loire
- Department: Indre
- Arrondissement: Châteauroux
- Canton: Levroux
- Intercommunality: CC Levroux Boischaut Champagne

Government
  - Mayor (2020–2026): Hugues Foucault (DVD)
- Area^{1}: 18.36 km^{2} (7.09 sq mi)
- Elevation: 148 m (486 ft)
- Highest elevation: 186 m (610 ft)
- Lowest elevation: 132 m (433 ft)
- Population (2023): 125
  - Density: 6.81/km^{2} (17.6/sq mi)
- Time zone: UTC+01:00 (CET)
  - Summer (DST): UTC+02:00 (CEST)
- INSEE/Postal code: 36024 /36110
- ^{1} French Land Register data, which excludes lakes, ponds, glaciers > 1 km^{2} (0.386 sq mi or 247 acres) and river estuaries.

Bretagne (French pronunciation: [bʁətaɲ]) is a commune in the Indre department in central France.

== Population ==
Historical population
Year	Pop.	±% p.a.
1968	179	—
1975	147	−2.77%
1982	122	−2.63%
1990	95	−3.08%
1999	81	−1.76%
2007	100	+2.67%
2012	150	+8.45%
2017	147	−0.40%
2023	125	−2.67%
Source: INSEE

== See also ==
- Communes of the Indre department
