= AC Mobil 34 Chrysalin =

Chrysalin

General information
- Type: Microlight aircraft
- National origin: France
- Manufacturer: AC Mobil 34
- Status: In Production

The AC Mobil 34 Chrysalin is a two-seat light aircraft produced in France in kitplane form. The aircraft was designed to comply with the Fédération Aéronautique Internationale microlight rules.

== Design and development ==
Constructed of composite materials, it is a conventional high-wing braced monoplane with a fixed tricycle undercarriage. The pilot and passenger sit in a side-by-side configuration.

The Construction is a fibreglass and vinyl ester sandwich, which results in a low empty weight of 283 kg (624 lb). The aircraft features folding wings. the Standard engine is the 60 kW (80 hp) Rotax 912 air- and liquid-cooled, four-stroke, four cylinder piston aircraft engine.

== Specifications (Chrysalin) ==
Data from Tacke

General characteristics

- Crew: one
- Capacity: one passenger
- Wingspan: 9.6 m (31 ft 6 in)
- Wing area: 13.5 m^{2} (145 sq ft)
- Aspect ratio: 6.83
- Empty weight: 283 kg (624 lb)
- Max takeoff weight: 472.5 kg (1,042 lb)
- Powerplant: 1 × Rotax 912 air-cooled, four stroke, four cylinder piston engine, 60 kW (80 hp)

Performance

- Maximum speed: 190 km/h (120 mph, 100 kn)
- Cruise speed: 150 km/h (93 mph, 81 kn)
- Stall speed: 62 km/h (39 mph, 33 kn)
- Rate of climb: 5.25 m/s (1,033 ft/min)

== See also ==
Comparable aircraft:

- 3Xtrim 3X55 Trener
