= Eustadiola =

Saint, widow and abbess

Saint Eustadiola

Nun
- Born: 594; Bourges, France
- Died: 684 (aged 89–90)
- Venerated in: Eastern Orthodox Church; Catholic Church
- Feast: 8 June

Eustadiola (594–684) was a saint, widow, and abbess. She was born to wealthy and politically powerful parents in Bourges, France. She married due to pressure from her family, but became a widow at a young age, which gave her the financial and social independence to live what Sainted Women of the Dark Ages centuries later called a "semiretired religious life". She gave away her wealth to the poor, founded churches, monasteries, and convents, and used her wealth and influence to expand and decorate the buildings. Eustadiola was abbess of the convent she founded in Bourges, and lived as an ascetic for 70 years. Many miracles and healings were attributed to her. Her feast day is celebrated on 8 June.

== Life ==
Eustadiola was born in 594 to the senatorial nobility, to wealthy and politically powerful parents, in Bourges, France. She received an education and "became wise in religious ways" at a young age. Her parents urged her to marry to give them heirs, which she did, and had one son, Tetradius. She was widowed at a young age, which gave her the financial and social independence to live a "semiretired religious life" after her husband died, without any formal vows or submission to outside monastic rules, like many wealthy widows of the time. The little that is known about Eustadiola is because her biography is documented in the early 8th-century hagiography of her patron, contemporary, and fellow saint, Bishop Sulpicius the Pious, who helped her resist her family's pressure to remarry.

Like many wealthy widows of the time, Eustadiola gave away her wealth to the poor, and dedicated the houses she owned as basilicas in honor of the Virgin Mary and the 3rd-century martyr, Saint Eugenia of Rome. She decorated the churches with gold and silver vessels, gems and other jewels, objects used during masses and ceremonies, books, and turrets. She made, with her own hands and assisted by her servants, embroidered vestments, altar cloths with gold fringes, and wall hangings. She built a monastery and a convent, where she and other women, inspired by her example, lived in community as nuns, but without formal recognition. Eustadiola was abbess of the convent she founded, Moyen-Montiers at Bourges, and lived as an ascetic for 70 years, caring for the poor and supporting widows and orphans. She did not live a strictly cloistered life because of her daily trips to the basilica of Saint Paul in Bourges, which she helped build. Like many convents and monasteries of the period, her communities accepted both wealthy and poor women and its residents' ranks and position in society were unimportant.

As historian Jo Ann McNamara said, "She was full of faith, ablaze with charity, affable of speech, amicable of aspect, endowed with prudence, famed for temperance, firm with internal fortitude, steady with just censures, great of spirit, robust with patience and gentle in humility". Many cures and healings were attributed to Eustadiola's prayers. For example, blind people received sight from the water in which she washed her hands and face. Her prayers and the prayers of her fellow nuns ended a drought; she encouraged the sisters at the basilica of St. Paul to pray for rain, which were answered almost immediately; before they were able to return home to the convent, they were drenched by the downpour. According to McNamara, "such proof of divine favor" helped protect Eustadiola's wealth from those who would prevent her from using it to support her communities and charitable works, and provided her with "prestige as a mediator in settling local quarrels".

Eustadiola died in 684, at the age of 90, and was buried at St. Paul's Basilica. The bishop of Bournes, who attended her funeral, reported that "he had never seen such enormous grief at the death of a religious at church or even at the end of anyone in royal power". Her feast day is celebrated on 8 June.

== Legacy ==
Little is known about Eustadiola; McNamara calls her one of "many forgotten individuals who pursued roads to sanctity not often commemorated by official historians". The kind of informal, unsupervised asceticism she practiced was disapproved of since the time of Pope Gregory I, but it was still widespread in Gaul in the 7th century. According to writer Jane T. Schulenburg, Eustadiola, like many abbesses and saints of her day, was praised for enlarging her churches and monastic buildings, for her role in obtaining relics for them, and for decorating and enriching their appearance.

Many miracles, including healings from blindness and lameness, occurred at her tomb and through her intercessions, both before her death and afterwards. McNamara reports that two people were healed of blindness after applying a mixture of dust from her tomb and oil from the lamp before her sepulcher to their eyes and another when she was anointed with the lamp oil at Eustadiola's sepulcher. McNamara reported that so many people were healed, it was difficult to list them all.

== Works cited ==
- McNamara, Jo Ann; Halborg, John E.; Whatley, E. Gordon (eds. and trans.) (1992). Sainted Women of the Dark Ages. Durham, North Carolina: Duke University Press. ISBN 0822382369.
- McNamara, Jo Ann (1996). Sisters in Arms: Catholic Nuns Through Two Millennia. Cambridge, Massachusetts: Harvard University Press. ISBN 067480984X.
