= Canton of Levroux =

Coordinates: 46.98°N 1.61°E

The canton of Levroux is an administrative division of the Indre department, central France. Its borders were modified at the French canton reorganisation which came into effect in March 2015. Its seat is in Levroux.

It consists of the following communes:

1. Aize
2. Baudres
3. Bouges-le-Château
4. Bretagne
5. Brion
6. Buxeuil
7. La Champenoise
8. La Chapelle-Saint-Laurian
9. Coings
10. Diou
11. Fontenay
12. Francillon
13. Giroux
14. Guilly
15. Levroux
16. Liniez
17. Lizeray
18. Luçay-le-Libre
19. Ménétréols-sous-Vatan
20. Meunet-sur-Vatan
21. Moulins-sur-Céphons
22. Paudy
23. Reboursin
24. Reuilly
25. Rouvres-les-Bois
26. Saint-Aoustrille
27. Sainte-Lizaigne
28. Saint-Florentin
29. Saint-Maur (partly)
30. Saint-Pierre-de-Jards
31. Saint-Valentin
32. Vatan
33. Villegongis
34. Vineuil
