= Buxeuil, Indre =

Buxeuil
- Commune
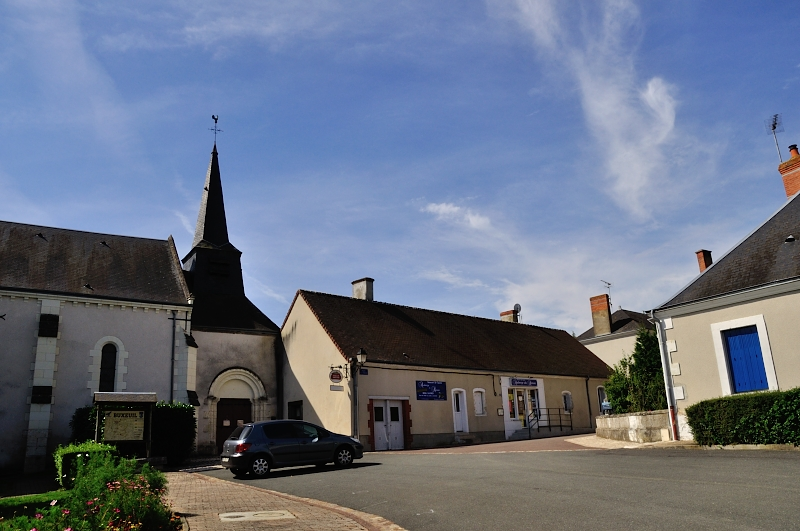
- The main square in Buxeuil
- Location of Buxeuil
- Location within France Location within Centre-Val de Loire
- Coordinates: 47°08′02″N 1°41′15″E
- Country: France
- Region: Centre-Val de Loire
- Department: Indre
- Arrondissement: Issoudun
- Canton: Levroux
- Intercommunality: Champagne Boischauts

Government
  - Mayor (2020–2026): Dominique Lapoumeroulie
- Area^{1}: 19.75 km^{2} (7.63 sq mi)
- Elevation: 110 m (360 ft)
- Highest elevation: 161 m (528 ft)
- Lowest elevation: 97 m (318 ft)
- Population (2023): 214
  - Density: 10.8/km^{2} (28.1/sq mi)
- Time zone: UTC+01:00 (CET)
  - Summer (DST): UTC+02:00 (CEST)
- INSEE/Postal code: 36029 /36150
- ^{1} French Land Register data, which excludes lakes, ponds, glaciers > 1 km^{2} (0.386 sq mi or 247 acres) and river estuaries.

Buxeuil is a commune in the Indre department in central France.

== Population ==
Historical population
Year	Pop.	±% p.a.
1968	322	—
1975	271	−2.43%
1982	231	−2.26%
1990	202	−1.66%
1999	228	+1.35%
2007	220	−0.45%
2012	223	+0.27%
2017	222	−0.09%
2023	214	−0.61%
Source: INSEE

== See also ==
- Communes of the Indre department
