= Arboretum de Segrez =

Historic arboretum in Île-de-France, France

Coordinates: 48.54°N 2.177°E

The Arboretum de Segrez is a historic arboretum located within the Domaine de Segrez on Rue Alphonse Lavallée, Saint-Sulpice-de-Favières, Essonne, Île-de-France, France.

The arboretum was established in 1857, as a scientific undertaking by Pierre Alphonse Martin Lavallée (1836-1884), a French botanist and horticulturist. It included a herbarium and botanical library, and by 1875 was one of the largest collections of woody plants in the world. After Lavallée's death in 1884, scientific cultivation of the arboretum ceased, but a number of mature specimens can still be seen on the domain's grounds.

== See also ==
- List of botanical gardens in France
