= Luçay-le-Libre =

- Commune
- Location of Luçay-le-Libre
- Location within France Location within Centre-Val de Loire
- Coordinates: 47°05′12″N 1°54′21″E
- Country: France
- Region: Centre-Val de Loire
- Department: Indre
- Arrondissement: Issoudun
- Canton: Levroux

Government
  - Mayor (2020–2026): Luc Pion
- Area^{1}: 11.85 km^{2} (4.58 sq mi)
- Elevation: 139 m (456 ft)
- Highest elevation: 157 m (515 ft)
- Lowest elevation: 119 m (390 ft)
- Population (2023): 105
  - Density: 8.86/km^{2} (22.9/sq mi)
- Time zone: UTC+01:00 (CET)
  - Summer (DST): UTC+02:00 (CEST)
- INSEE/Postal code: 36102 /36150
- ^{1} French Land Register data, which excludes lakes, ponds, glaciers > 1 km^{2} (0.386 sq mi or 247 acres) and river estuaries.

Luçay-le-Libre (French pronunciation: [lysɛ lə libʁ]) is a commune in the Indre department in central France.

== Population ==
Historical population
Year	Pop.	±% p.a.
1968	195	—
1975	133	−5.32%
1982	129	−0.44%
1990	102	−2.89%
1999	102	+0.00%
2007	108	+0.72%
2012	124	+2.80%
2017	99	−4.40%
2023	105	+0.99%
Source: INSEE

== See also ==
- Communes of the Indre department
