= Austregisilus =

Saint Austregisilus
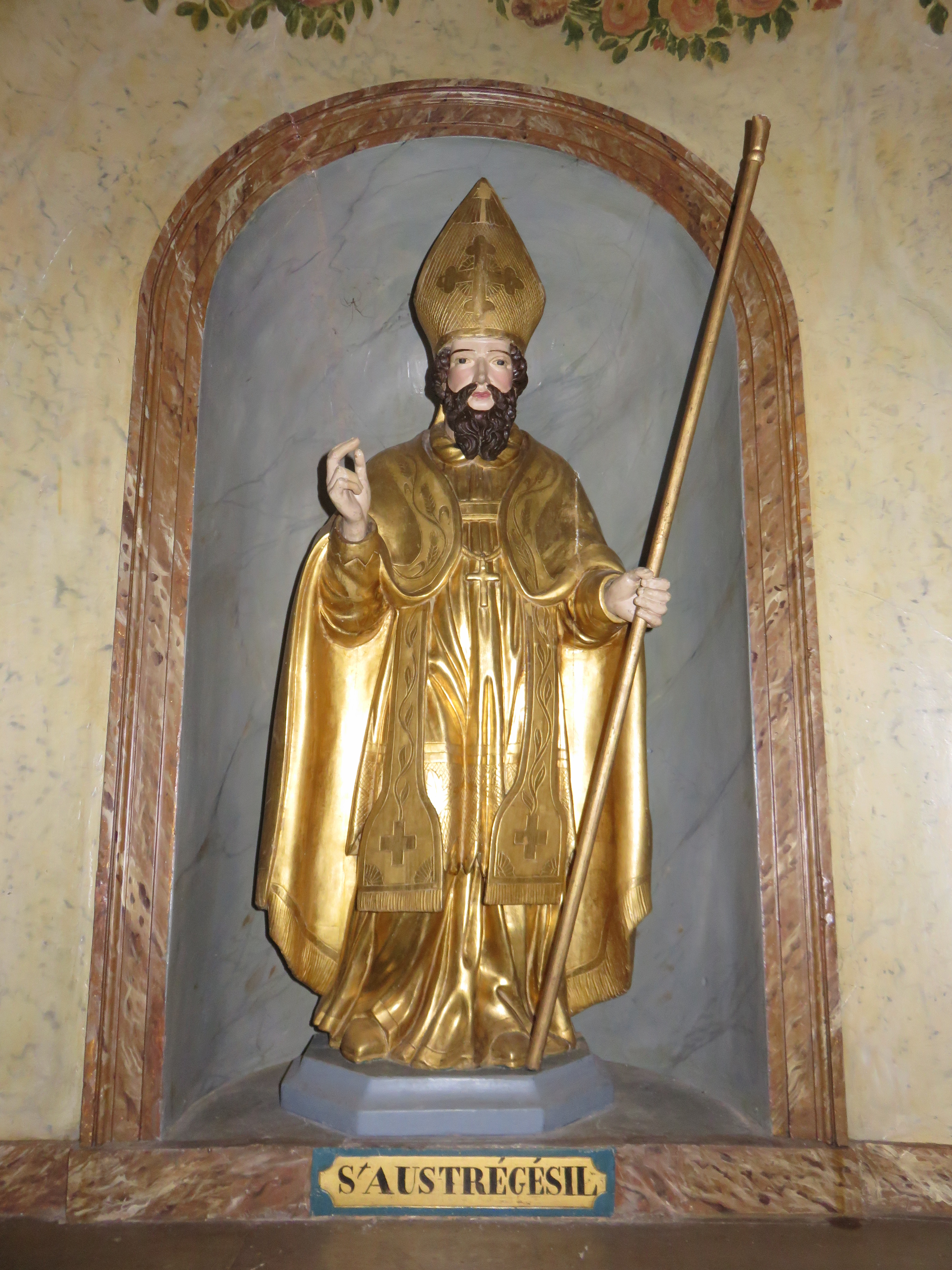
- Statue of Austregisilus in the church of Frontenas.
- Born: Bourges
- Died: 624 AD
- Venerated in: Roman Catholic Church; Eastern Orthodox Church
- Feast: 20 May
- Attributes: portrayed as a knight on horseback, sometimes with a religious habit over his armor; a man falls from a horse in front of him

Saint Austregisilus (Outrille, Aoustrille; died 624) was a Frankish bishop and bishop of Bourges from 612 until his death in 624. He is venerated as a saint in the Catholic Church, with his feast day is 20 May.

== Life ==
A native of Bourges, he was educated as a courtier, he became an attendant at the Court of King Gontram at Chalon-sur-Saône. However, Austregisilus wanted to become a monk and entered the abbey of Saint-Nizier at Lyon, where he became abbot. He was elected bishop of Bourges in 612.

He ordained Sulpitius the Pious. Saint Amand studied under him.

The villages of Saint-Outrille and Saint-Aoustrille are named after him.
