= Arrondissement of Issoudun =

Coordinates: 46°57′N 1°59′E

Issoudun
- Arrondissement
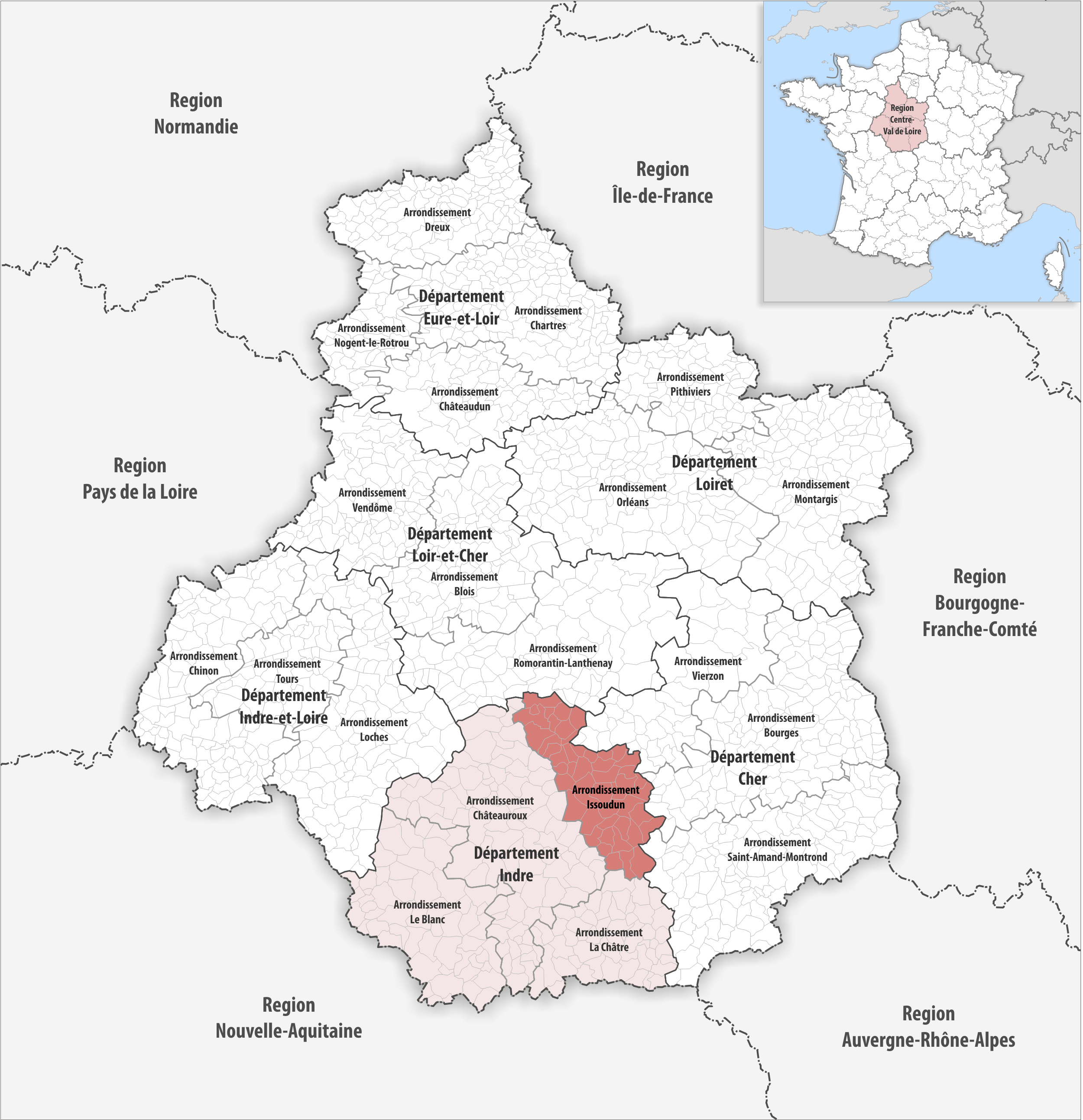
- Location within the region Centre-Val de Loire
- Country: France
- Region: Centre-Val de Loire
- Department: Indre
- No. of communes: {{{nbcomm}}}
- Area: 1,182.3 km^{2} (456.5 sq mi)
- Population (2023): 32,704
  - Density: 27.661/km^{2} (71.643/sq mi)
- INSEE code: 364

The arrondissement of Issoudun is an arrondissement of France in the Indre department in the Centre-Val de Loire region. It has 49 communes. Its population is 32,694 (2021), and its area is 1,182.3 km^{2} (456.5 sq mi).

== Composition ==
The communes of the arrondissement of Issoudun, and their INSEE codes, are:

1. Aize (36002)
2. Ambrault (36003)
3. Anjouin (36004)
4. Bagneux (36011)
5. Bommiers (36019)
6. Les Bordes (36021)
7. Brives (36027)
8. Buxeuil (36029)
9. Chabris (36034)
10. La Champenoise (36037)
11. La Chapelle-Saint-Laurian (36041)
12. Chouday (36052)
13. Condé (36059)
14. Diou (36065)
15. Dun-le-Poëlier (36068)
16. Fontenay (36075)
17. Giroux (36083)
18. Guilly (36085)
19. Issoudun (36088)
20. Liniez (36097)
21. Lizeray (36098)
22. Luçay-le-Libre (36102)
23. Menetou-sur-Nahon (36115)
24. Ménétréols-sous-Vatan (36116)
25. Meunet-Planches (36121)
26. Meunet-sur-Vatan (36122)
27. Migny (36125)
28. Neuvy-Pailloux (36140)
29. Orville (36147)
30. Paudy (36152)
31. Poulaines (36162)
32. Pruniers (36169)
33. Reboursin (36170)
34. Reuilly (36171)
35. Saint-Aoustrille (36179)
36. Saint-Aubin (36181)
37. Saint-Christophe-en-Bazelle (36185)
38. Sainte-Fauste (36190)
39. Sainte-Lizaigne (36199)
40. Saint-Florentin (36191)
41. Saint-Georges-sur-Arnon (36195)
42. Saint-Pierre-de-Jards (36205)
43. Saint-Valentin (36209)
44. Ségry (36215)
45. Sembleçay (36217)
46. Thizay (36222)
47. Val-Fouzon (36229)
48. Vatan (36230)
49. Vouillon (36248)

== History ==
The arrondissement of Issoudun was created in 1800, It was disbanded in 1926 and restored in 1942.

As a result of the reorganisation of the cantons of France which came into effect in 2015, the borders of the cantons are no longer related to the borders of the arrondissements. The cantons of the arrondissement of Issoudun were, as of January 2015:

1. Issoudun-Nord
2. Issoudun-Sud
3. Saint-Christophe-en-Bazelle
4. Vatan
