= Saint-Aoustrille =

- Commune
- Coat of arms
- Location of Saint-Aoustrille
- Location within France Location within Centre-Val de Loire
- Coordinates: 46°56′22″N 1°55′20″E
- Country: France
- Region: Centre-Val de Loire
- Department: Indre
- Arrondissement: Issoudun
- Canton: Levroux
- Intercommunality: Champagne Boischauts

Government
  - Mayor (2020–2026): Thierry Chauveau
- Area^{1}: 19.47 km^{2} (7.52 sq mi)
- Elevation: 152 m (499 ft)
- Highest elevation: 163 m (535 ft)
- Lowest elevation: 127 m (417 ft)
- Population (2023): 199
  - Density: 10.2/km^{2} (26.5/sq mi)
- Time zone: UTC+01:00 (CET)
  - Summer (DST): UTC+02:00 (CEST)
- INSEE/Postal code: 36179 /36100
- ^{1} French Land Register data, which excludes lakes, ponds, glaciers > 1 km^{2} (0.386 sq mi or 247 acres) and river estuaries.

Saint-Aoustrille (French pronunciation: [sɛ̃.t‿austʁij]) is a commune in the Indre department in central France.

It is named after the 7th-century Saint Austregisilus.

== Population ==
Historical population
Year	Pop.	±% p.a.
1968	210	—
1975	202	−0.55%
1982	153	−3.89%
1990	181	+2.12%
1999	159	−1.43%
2007	160	+0.08%
2012	204	+4.98%
2017	227	+2.16%
2023	199	−2.17%
Source: INSEE

== See also ==
- Communes of the Indre department
