= Fontenay, Indre =

Fontenay
- Commune
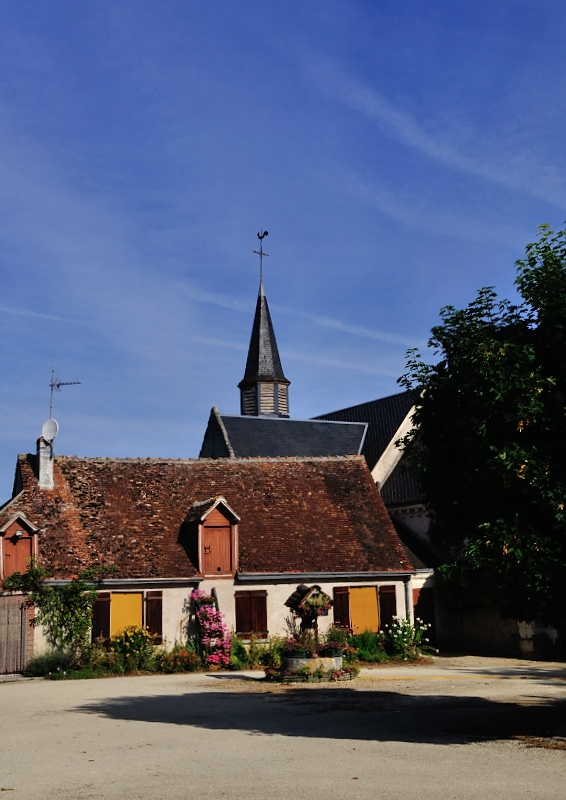
- The main square in Fontenay
- Location of Fontenay
- Location within France Location within Centre-Val de Loire
- Coordinates: 47°03′41″N 1°44′48″E
- Country: France
- Region: Centre-Val de Loire
- Department: Indre
- Arrondissement: Issoudun
- Canton: Levroux
- Intercommunality: Champagne Boischauts

Government
  - Mayor (2020–2026): Elisabeth Gaultier
- Area^{1}: 12.33 km^{2} (4.76 sq mi)
- Elevation: 135 m (443 ft)
- Highest elevation: 171 m (561 ft)
- Lowest elevation: 118 m (387 ft)
- Population (2023): 71
  - Density: 5.8/km^{2} (15/sq mi)
- Time zone: UTC+01:00 (CET)
  - Summer (DST): UTC+02:00 (CEST)
- INSEE/Postal code: 36075 /36150
- ^{1} French Land Register data, which excludes lakes, ponds, glaciers > 1 km^{2} (0.386 sq mi or 247 acres) and river estuaries.

Fontenay (French pronunciation: [fɔ̃tnɛ]) is a commune in the Indre department in central France.

== Population ==
Historical population
Year	Pop.	±% p.a.
1968	175	—
1975	133	−3.84%
1982	111	−2.55%
1990	92	−2.32%
1999	86	−0.75%
2007	80	−0.90%
2012	95	+3.50%
2017	88	−1.52%
2023	71	−3.51%
Source: INSEE

== See also ==
- Communes of the Indre department
