= Diou, Indre =

Diou
- Commune
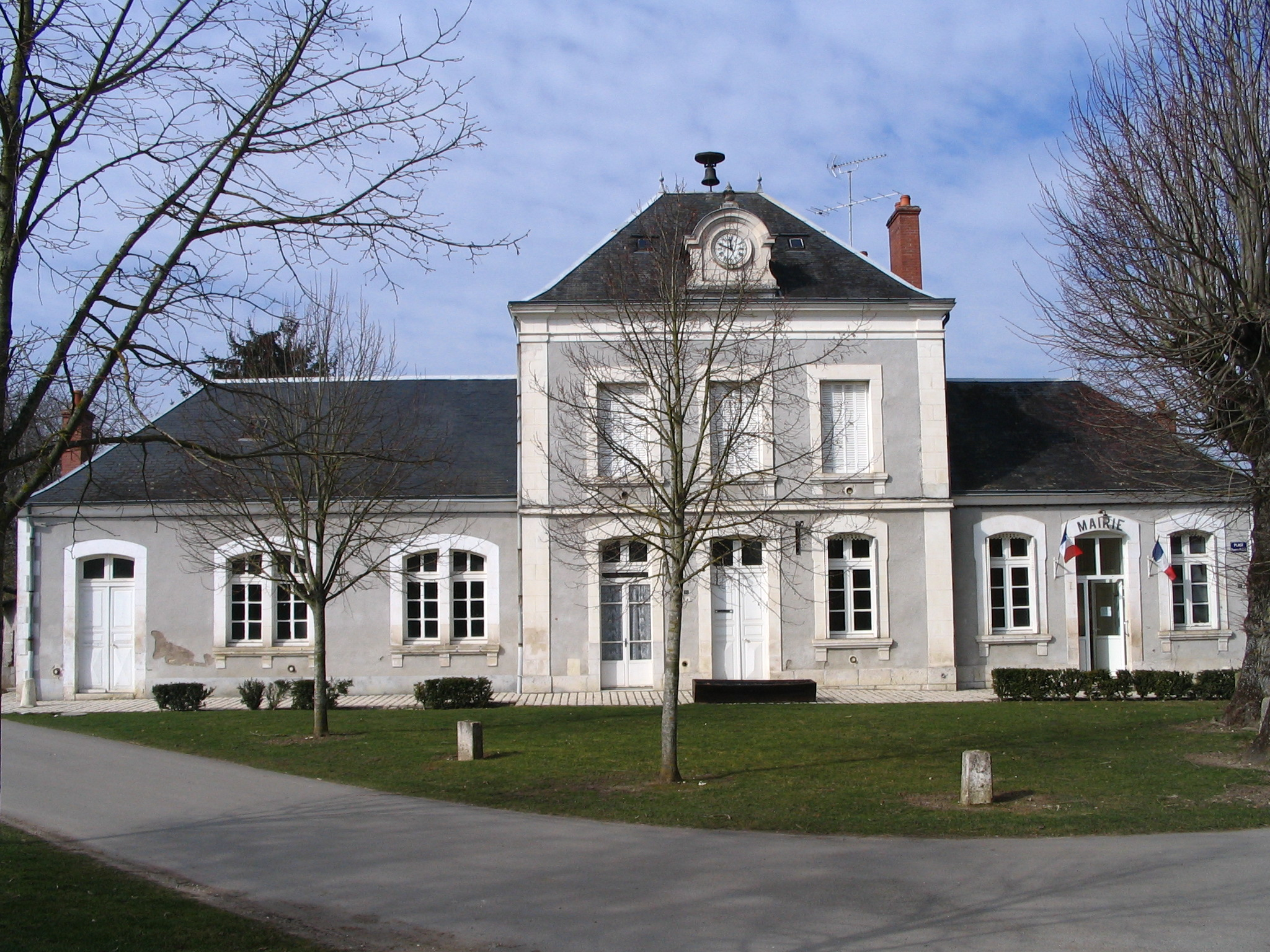
- The town hall in Diou
- Location of Diou
- Location within France Location within Centre-Val de Loire
- Coordinates: 47°02′49″N 2°01′37″E
- Country: France
- Region: Centre-Val de Loire
- Department: Indre
- Arrondissement: Issoudun
- Canton: Levroux
- Intercommunality: CC Pays d'Issoudun

Government
  - Mayor (2020–2026): Sylvie Rancy
- Area^{1}: 16.39 km^{2} (6.33 sq mi)
- Elevation: 118 m (387 ft)
- Highest elevation: 176 m (577 ft)
- Lowest elevation: 112 m (367 ft)
- Population (2023): 256
  - Density: 15.6/km^{2} (40.5/sq mi)
- Time zone: UTC+01:00 (CET)
  - Summer (DST): UTC+02:00 (CEST)
- INSEE/Postal code: 36065 /36260
- ^{1} French Land Register data, which excludes lakes, ponds, glaciers > 1 km^{2} (0.386 sq mi or 247 acres) and river estuaries.

Diou (French pronunciation: [dju]) is a commune in the Indre department in central France.

== Population ==
Historical population
Year	Pop.	±% p.a.
1968	261	—
1975	236	−1.43%
1982	215	−1.32%
1990	212	−0.18%
1999	235	+1.15%
2007	275	+1.98%
2012	256	−1.42%
2017	256	+0.00%
2023	256	+0.00%
Source: INSEE

== See also ==
- Communes of the Indre department
