= Vineuil, Indre =

Vineuil
- Commune
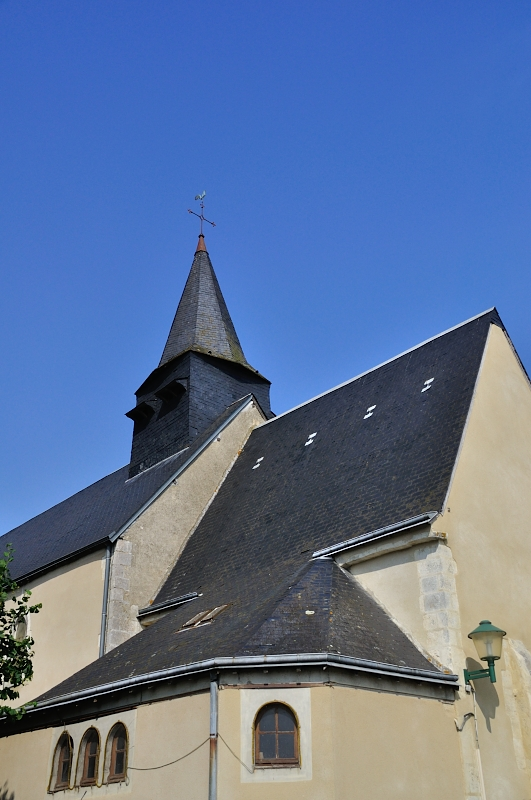
- The church of Saint-Vincent, in Vineuil
- Location of Vineuil
- Location within France Location within Centre-Val de Loire
- Coordinates: 46°54′05″N 1°38′10″E
- Country: France
- Region: Centre-Val de Loire
- Department: Indre
- Arrondissement: Châteauroux
- Canton: Levroux
- Intercommunality: CC Levroux Boischaut Champagne

Government
  - Mayor (2020–2026): Bernard Bachellerie
- Area^{1}: 44.41 km^{2} (17.15 sq mi)
- Elevation: 175 m (574 ft)
- Highest elevation: 186 m (610 ft)
- Lowest elevation: 142 m (466 ft)
- Population (2023): 1,241
  - Density: 27.94/km^{2} (72.38/sq mi)
- Time zone: UTC+01:00 (CET)
  - Summer (DST): UTC+02:00 (CEST)
- INSEE/Postal code: 36247 /36110
- ^{1} French Land Register data, which excludes lakes, ponds, glaciers > 1 km^{2} (0.386 sq mi or 247 acres) and river estuaries.

Vineuil (French pronunciation: [vinœj]) is a commune in the Indre department, Centre-Val de Loire, France.

== Population ==
Historical population
Year	Pop.	±% p.a.
1968	807	—
1975	803	−0.07%
1982	977	+2.84%
1990	1,133	+1.87%
1999	1,139	+0.06%
2007	1,152	+0.14%
2012	1,228	+1.29%
2017	1,228	+0.00%
2023	1,241	+0.18%
Source: INSEE

== See also ==
- Communes of the Indre department
