= Meunet-Planches =

- Commune
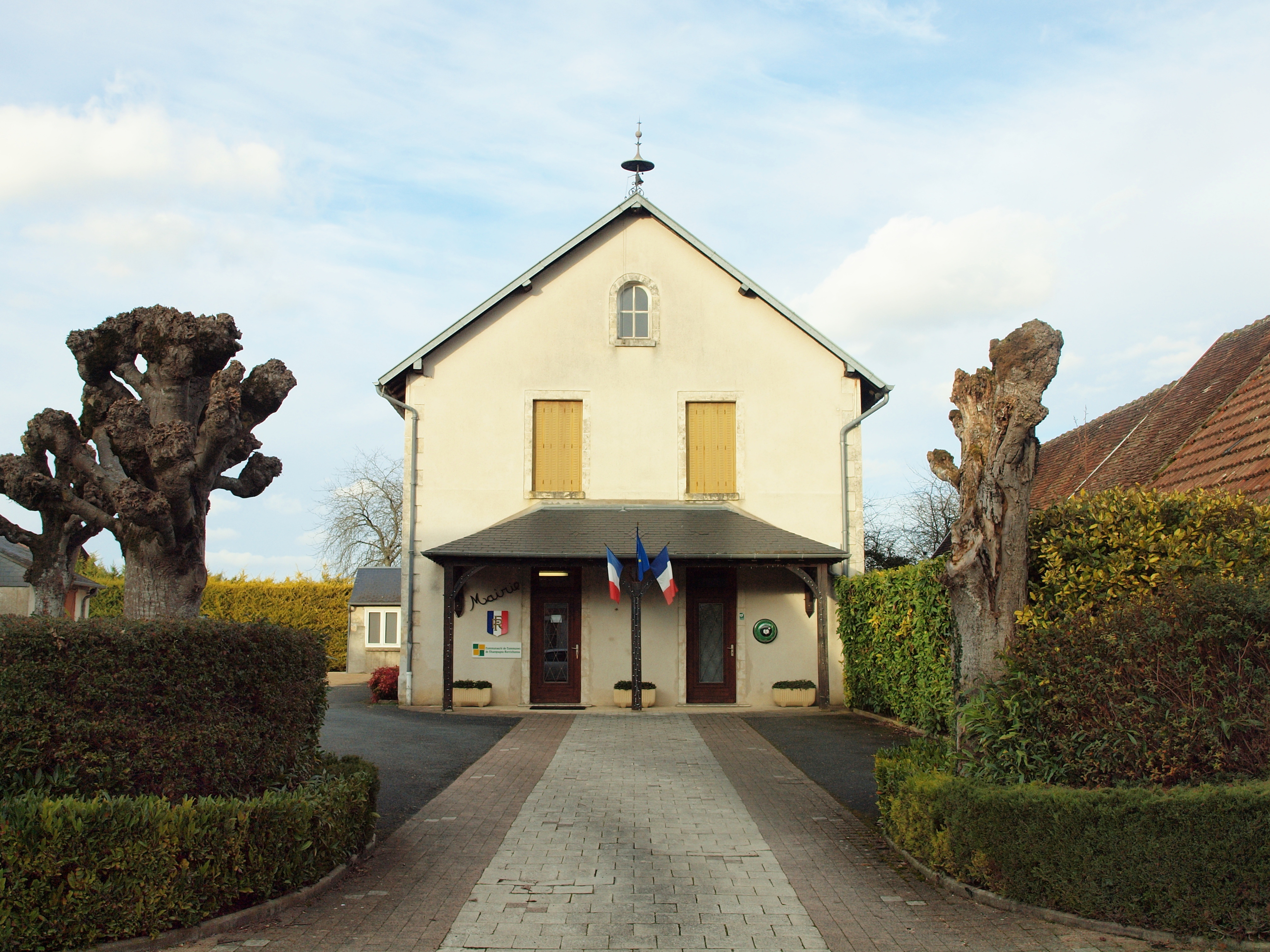
- Town hall
- Location of Meunet-Planches
- Location within France Location within Centre-Val de Loire
- Coordinates: 46°50′17″N 1°57′28″E
- Country: France
- Region: Centre-Val de Loire
- Department: Indre
- Arrondissement: Issoudun
- Canton: La Châtre
- Intercommunality: Champagne Boischauts

Government
  - Mayor (2020–2026): Catherine Virmaux
- Area^{1}: 26.73 km^{2} (10.32 sq mi)
- Elevation: 145 m (476 ft)
- Highest elevation: 174 m (571 ft)
- Lowest elevation: 132 m (433 ft)
- Population (2023): 166
  - Density: 6.21/km^{2} (16.1/sq mi)
- Time zone: UTC+01:00 (CET)
  - Summer (DST): UTC+02:00 (CEST)
- INSEE/Postal code: 36121 /36100
- ^{1} French Land Register data, which excludes lakes, ponds, glaciers > 1 km^{2} (0.386 sq mi or 247 acres) and river estuaries.

Meunet-Planches (French pronunciation: [mœnɛ plɑ̃ʃ]) is a commune in the Indre department in central France.

== Population ==
Historical population
Year	Pop.	±% p.a.
1968	233	—
1975	217	−1.01%
1982	162	−4.09%
1990	165	+0.23%
1999	140	−1.81%
2007	198	+4.43%
2012	191	−0.72%
2017	174	−1.85%
2023	166	−0.78%
Source: INSEE

== See also ==
- Communes of the Indre department
