= Saint-Florentin, Indre =

Saint-Florentin
- Commune
- Location of Saint-Florentin
- Location within France Location within Centre-Val de Loire
- Coordinates: 47°04′36″N 1°48′19″E
- Country: France
- Region: Centre-Val de Loire
- Department: Indre
- Arrondissement: Issoudun
- Canton: Levroux

Government
  - Mayor (2020–2026): Yanick Compain
- Area^{1}: 15.95 km^{2} (6.16 sq mi)
- Elevation: 126 m (413 ft)
- Highest elevation: 162 m (531 ft)
- Lowest elevation: 118 m (387 ft)
- Population (2023): 497
  - Density: 31.2/km^{2} (80.7/sq mi)
- Time zone: UTC+01:00 (CET)
  - Summer (DST): UTC+02:00 (CEST)
- INSEE/Postal code: 36191 /36150
- ^{1} French Land Register data, which excludes lakes, ponds, glaciers > 1 km^{2} (0.386 sq mi or 247 acres) and river estuaries.

Saint-Florentin (French pronunciation: [sɛ̃ flɔʁɑ̃tɛ̃]) is a commune in the Indre department in central France.

== Population ==
Historical population
| Year | Pop. | ±% p.a. |
|---|---|---|
| 1968 | 431 | — |
| 1975 | 399 | −1.10% |
| 1982 | 390 | −0.33% |
| 1990 | 438 | +1.46% |
| 1999 | 449 | +0.28% |
| 2007 | 478 | +0.79% |
| 2012 | 523 | +1.82% |
| 2017 | 534 | +0.42% |
| 2023 | 497 | −1.19% |
Source: INSEE

== See also ==
- Communes of the Indre department
