= Vatan, Indre =

Vatan
- Commune
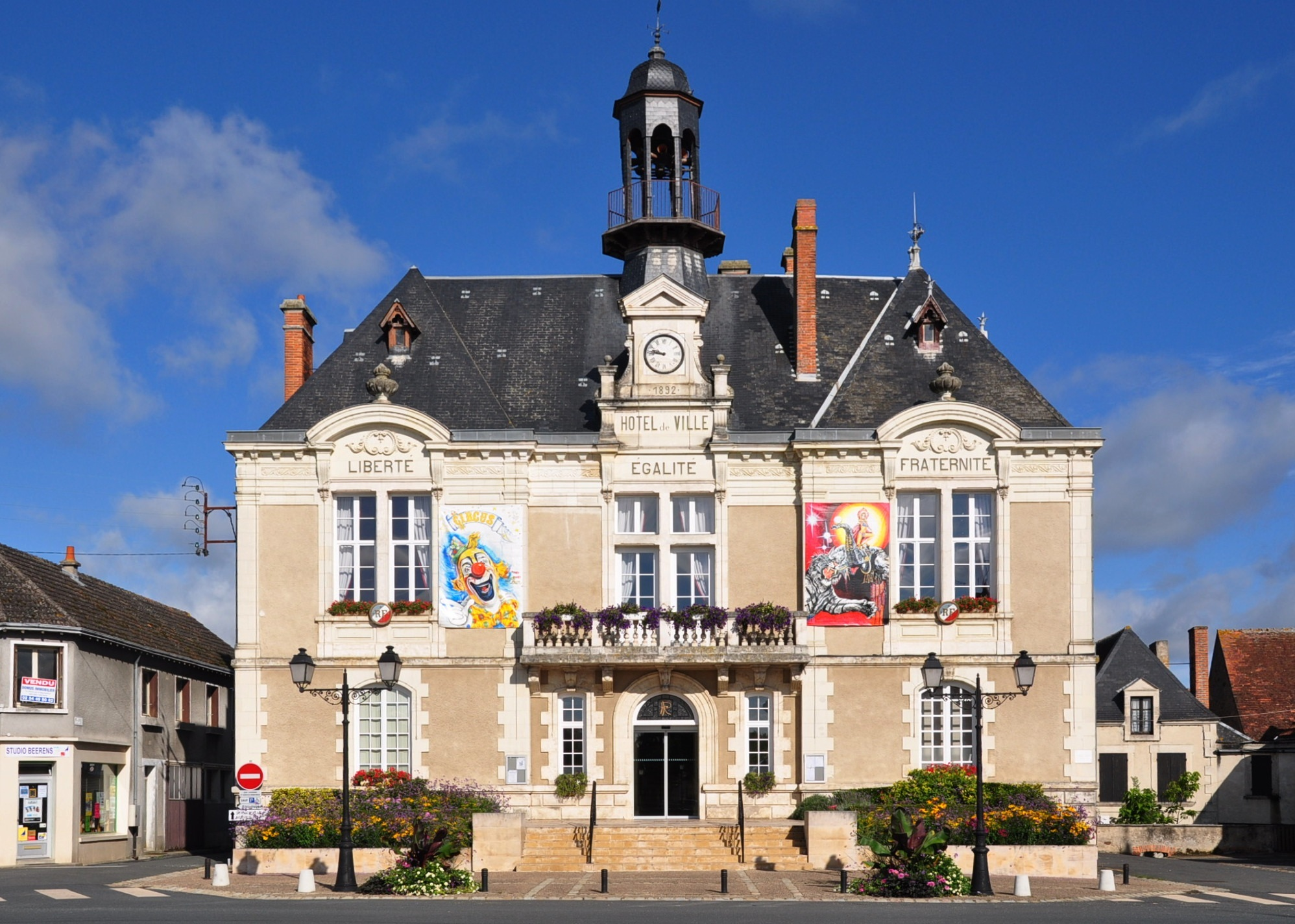
- The town hall in Vatan

- Coat of arms
- Location of Vatan
- Location within France Location within Centre-Val de Loire
- Coordinates: 47°04′27″N 1°48′41″E
- Country: France
- Region: Centre-Val de Loire
- Department: Indre
- Arrondissement: Issoudun
- Canton: Levroux

Government
  - Mayor (2020–2026): Philippe Métivier
- Area^{1}: 29.8 km^{2} (11.5 sq mi)
- Elevation: 132 m (433 ft)
- Highest elevation: 201 m (659 ft)
- Lowest elevation: 118 m (387 ft)
- Population (2023): 1,994
  - Density: 66.9/km^{2} (173/sq mi)
- Demonym(s): Vatanais, Vatanaise (French)
- Time zone: UTC+01:00 (CET)
  - Summer (DST): UTC+02:00 (CEST)
- INSEE/Postal code: 36230 /36150
- ^{1} French Land Register data, which excludes lakes, ponds, glaciers > 1 km^{2} (0.386 sq mi or 247 acres) and river estuaries.

Vatan (French pronunciation: [vatɑ̃]) is a French commune in the department of Indre, and the region of Centre-Val de Loire, Metropolitan France. The town has been labeled Village étape since 1997 and Ville fleurie with 2 flowers.

== Population ==
Historical population
Year	Pop.	±% p.a.
1968	2,194	—
1975	2,270	+0.49%
1982	2,046	−1.47%
1990	2,022	−0.15%
1999	1,972	−0.28%
2007	2,022	+0.31%
2012	2,033	+0.11%
2017	1,988	−0.45%
2023	1,994	+0.05%
Source: INSEE

== See also ==
- Communes of the Indre department

== Gallery ==
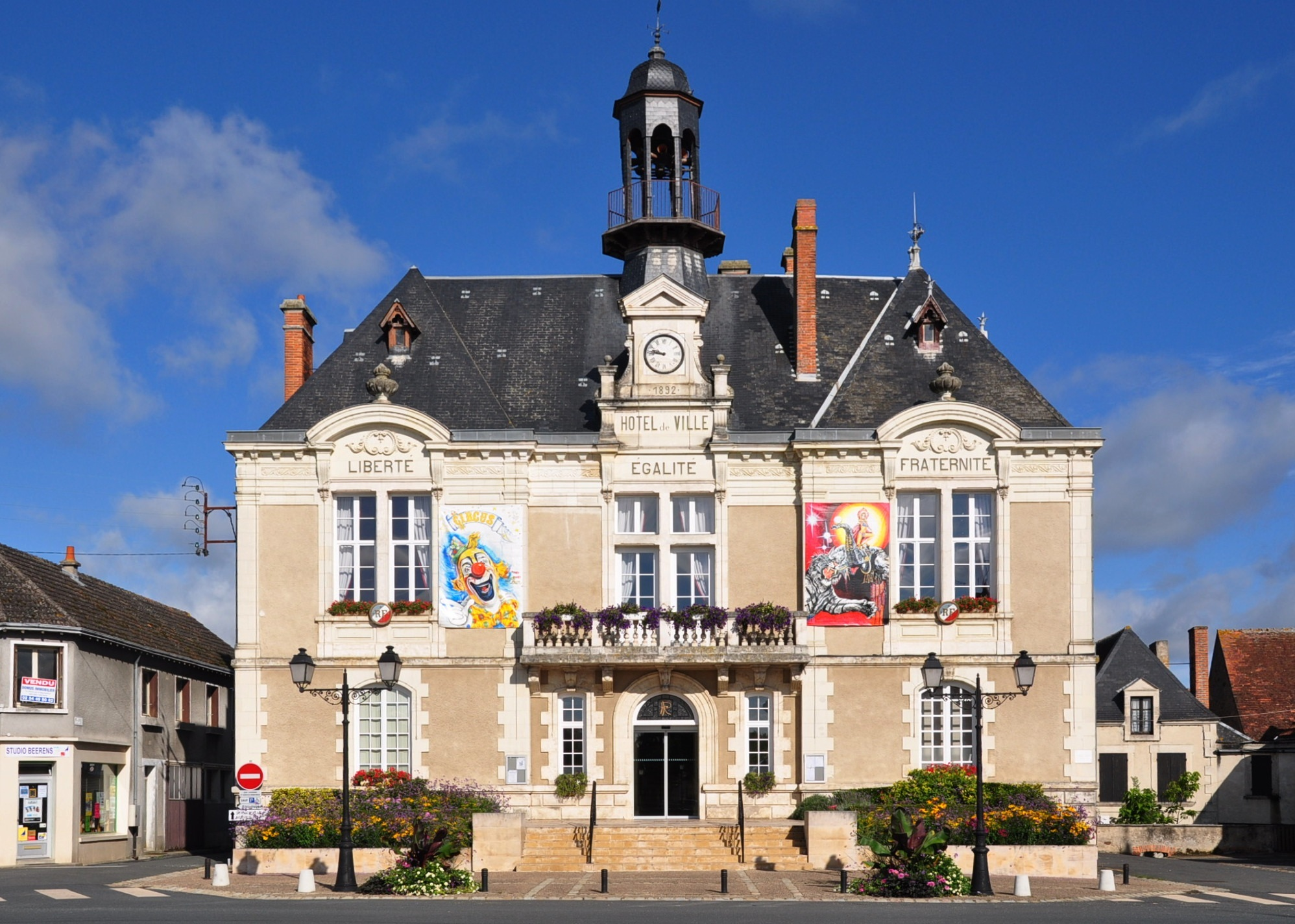
Town Hall

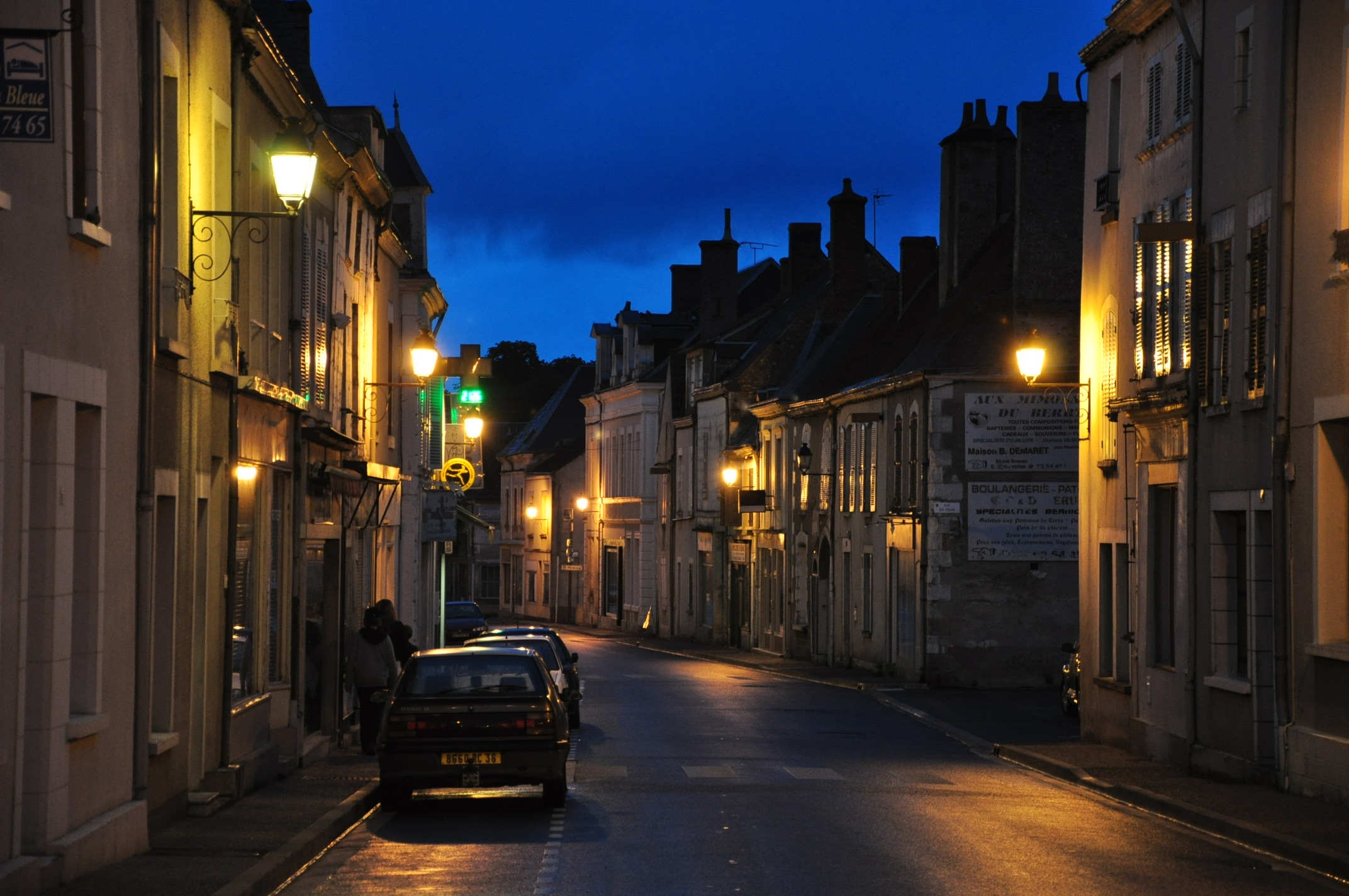
Main street at night

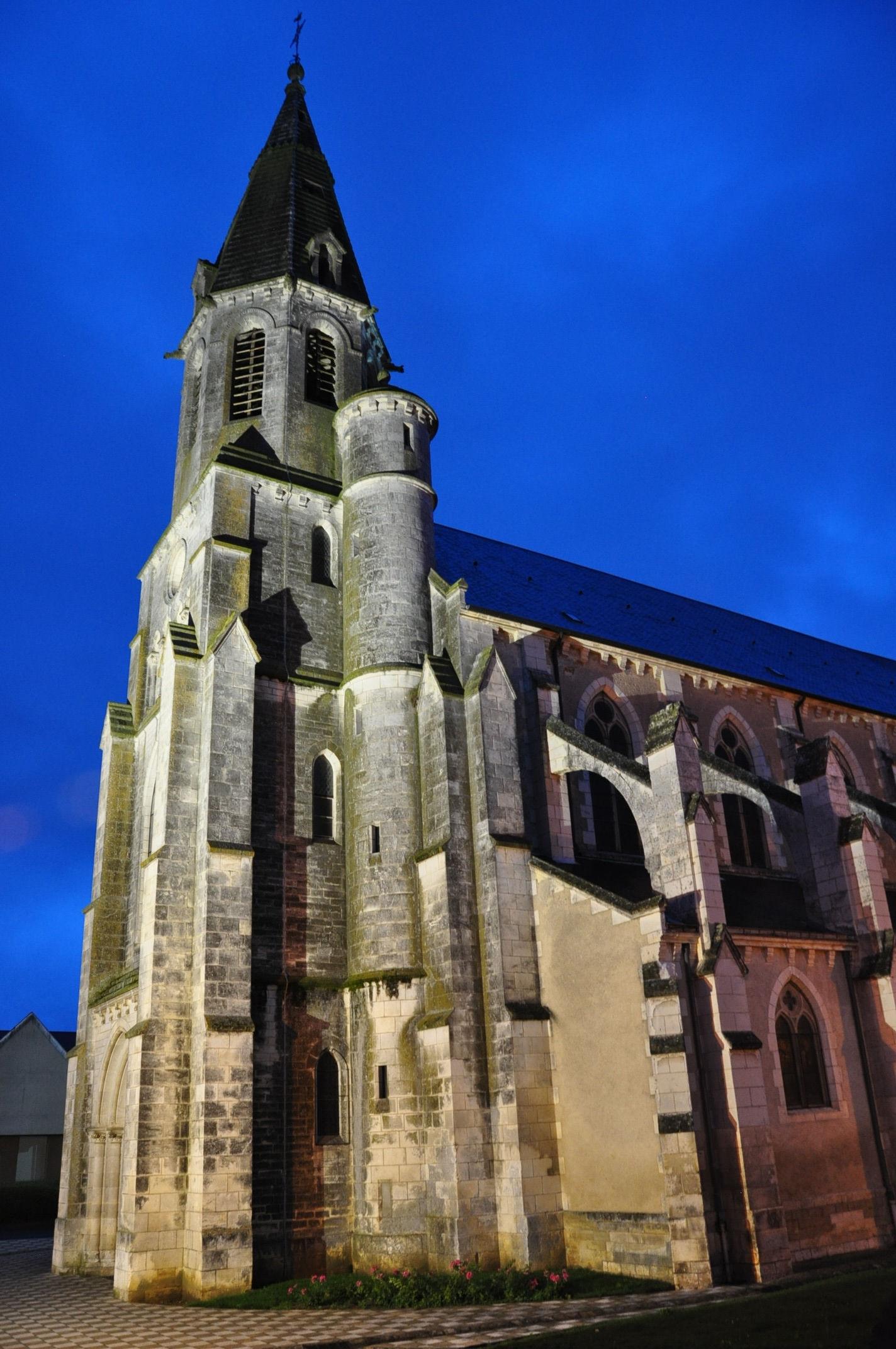
Saint-Laurien church

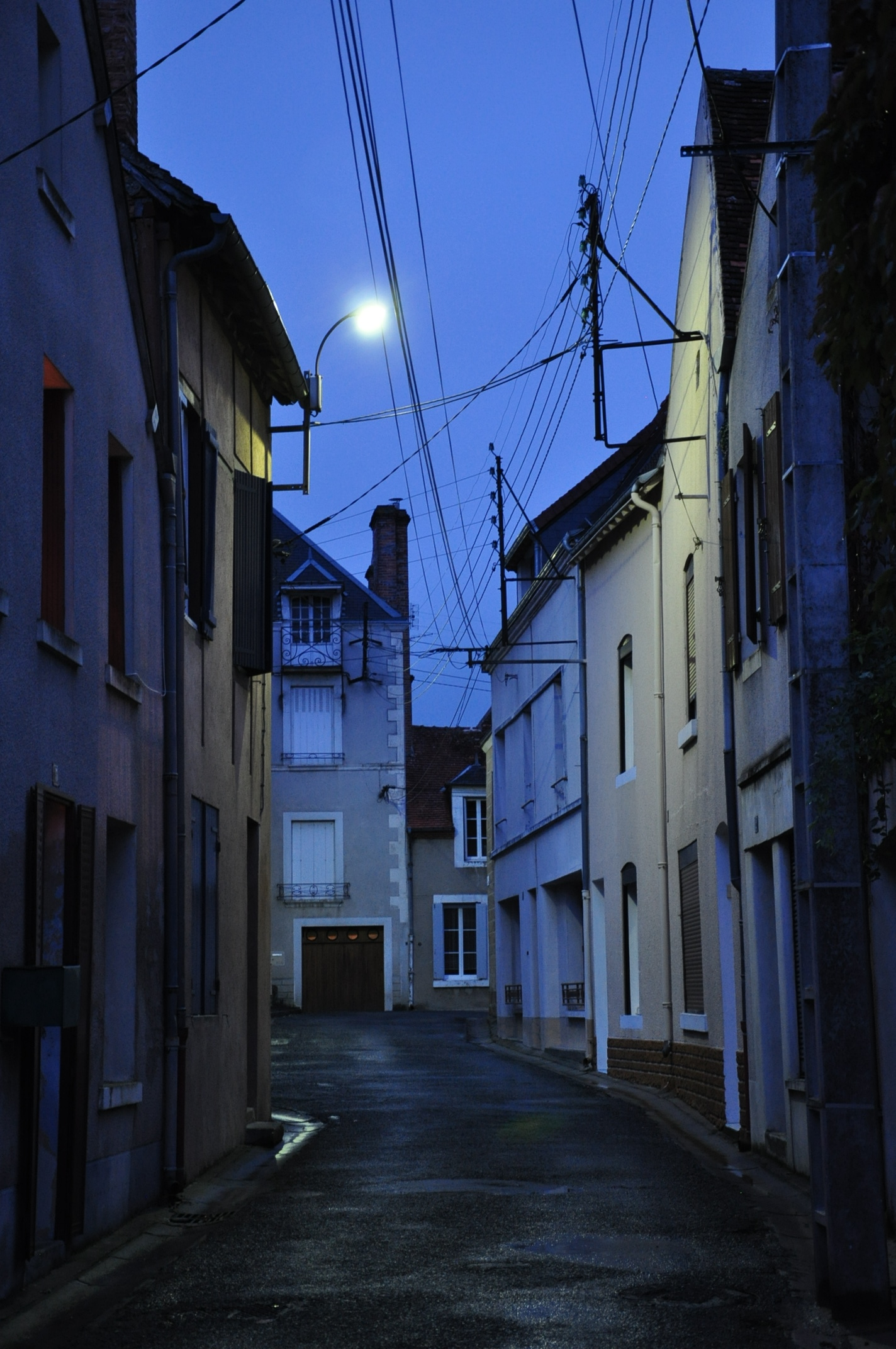
Saint Sulpice street

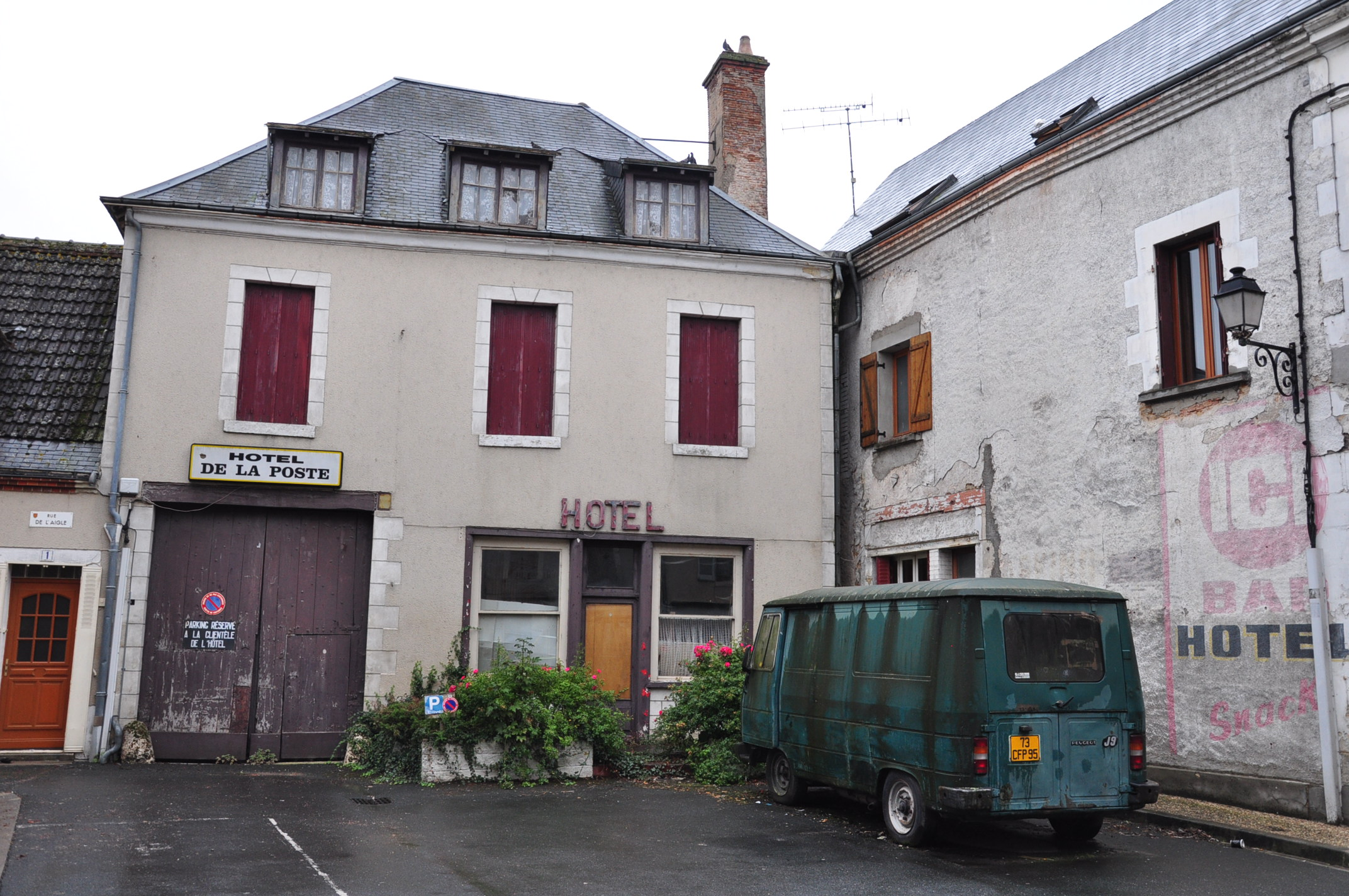
Hotel de la Poste
