= Indre's 1st constituency =

Constituency of the National Assembly of France

1st constituency of Indre
- inline Constituency of the National Assembly of France

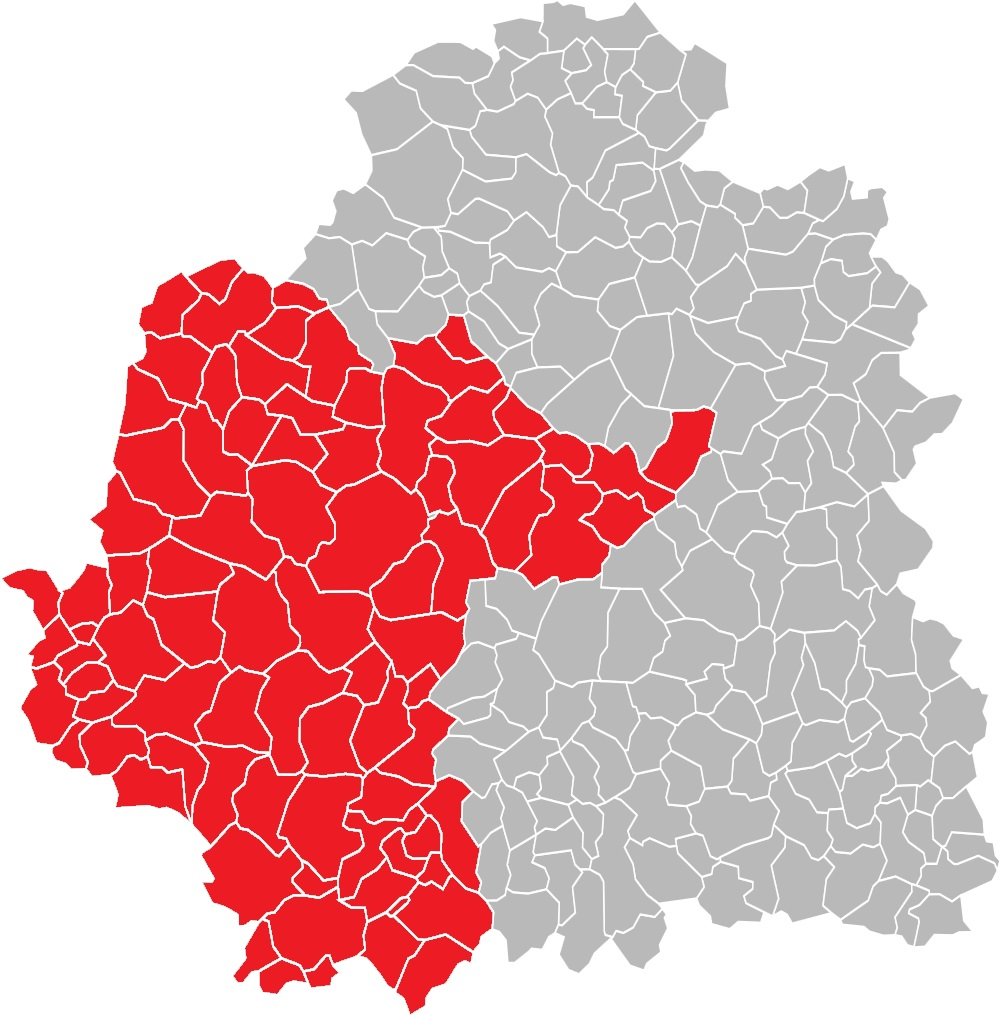
- 1st Constituency (after 2012) in Indre

- Location of Indre in France
- Deputy: François Jolivet; Horizons
- Department: Indre
- Cantons: Ardentes (1/12 communes), Le Blanc, Buzançais, Châteauroux-1 (1 commune + part of Châteauroux), Châteauroux-2, Châteauroux-3 and Saint-Gaultier (32/34 communes)

The 1st constituency of Indre is a French legislative constituency in the Indre département.

From 1958 to 2012, it was one of three constituencies in Indre. In the 2010 redistricting, the number of constituencies in Indre was reduced to two. The first constituency from 2012 consists of the following cantons (partial cantons noted in brackets) Ardentes (1/12 communes), Le Blanc, Buzançais, Châteauroux-1 (1 commune + part of Châteauroux), Châteauroux-2, Châteauroux-3 and Saint-Gaultier (32/34 communes).

== Deputies ==
Election	Member	Party
1988	Jean-Yves Gateaud	PS
1993	Michel Blondeau	DVD
1997	Jean-Yves Gateaud	PS
2002	Jean-Yves Hugon	UMP
2007	Michel Sapin	PS
2012	Jean-Paul Chanteguet	PS
2017	François Jolivet	LREM
2022	François Jolivet	Horizons
2024	François Jolivet	Horizons

== Election results ==
=== 2024 ===
Candidate	Party	Alliance	First round			Second round		
Candidate	Party	Alliance	Votes	%	+/–	Votes	%	+/–
Mylène Wunsch	RN		19,755	40.20	+17.90	21,689	44.49	new
François Jolivet	HOR	Ensemble	17,256	35.12	+7.59	27,060	55.51	-0.55
Eloïse Gonzalez	LFI	NFP	10,658	21.69	-0.85	withdrew		
Véronique Gelinaud	LO		756	1.54	-0.37			
Marie-Odile Trusch	REC		716	1.46	-2.73			
Votes			49,141	100.00		48,749	100.00	
Valid votes			49,141	96.51	-0.56	48,749	94.93	+5.18
Blank votes			1,132	2.22	+0.30	1,726	3.36	-3.33
Null votes			646	1.27	+0.26	876	1.71	-1.85
Turnout			50,919	66.06	+17.21	51,351	66.61	+20.18
Abstentions			26,156	33.94	-17.21	25,738	33.39	-20.18
Registered voters			77,075			77,089		
Result			HOR HOLD					

=== 2022 ===
Legislative election 2022: Indre's 1st constituency
Party	Candidate	Votes	%	±%
HOR (Ensemble)	François Jolivet	10,152	27.53	-9.63
LFI (NUPÉS)	Éloïse Gonzalez	8,313	22.54	-6.19
RN	Mylène Wunsch	8,225	22.30	+8.25
LR (UDC)	Alix Fruchon	6,705	18.18	+6.69
REC	Sandrine Felder	1,544	4.19	N/A
Others	N/A	1,939	-	−
Turnout		36,878	48.85	−1.12
2nd round result
HOR (Ensemble)	François Jolivet	18,158	56.02	-14.40
LFI (NUPÉS)	Éloïse Gonzalez	14,258	43.98	N/A
Turnout		32,416	46.43	+1.78
HOR gain from LREM				

=== 2017 ===
Candidate	Label	First round		Second round	
Candidate	Label	Votes	%	Votes	%
François Jolivet	REM	14,540	37.16	22,303	70.42
Mylène Wunsch	FN	5,499	14.05	9,369	29.58
Jean-Paul Chanteguet	PS	5,234	13.38		
Paulette Picard	LR	4,496	11.49		
Corinne Keller	FI	4,277	10.93		
Gilles des Gachons	DVD	1,781	4.55		
Muriel Beffara	ECO	995	2.54		
Michel Fradet	PCF	734	1.88		
Patrick Bouyat	ECO	471	1.20		
Alix Penloup-Arbona	DLF	407	1.04		
Véronique Gélinaud	EXG	311	0.79		
Jacques Charpentier	DIV	197	0.50		
Sophie Tissier	EXG	184	0.47		
Votes		39,126	100.00	31,672	100.00
Valid votes		39,126	97.28	31,672	88.06
Blank votes		772	1.92	3,101	8.62
Null votes		322	0.80	1,194	3.32
Turnout		40,220	49.93	35,967	44.65
Abstentions		40,326	50.07	44,578	55.35
Registered voters		80,546		80,545	
Source: Ministry of the Interior

=== 2012 ===
2012 legislative election in Indre's 1st constituency
Candidate	Party	First round		Second round	
Candidate	Party	Votes	%	Votes	%
Jean-Paul Chanteguet	PS	22,311	46.95%	27,452	58.80%
François Jolivet	UMP	14,351	30.20%	19,236	41.20%
Virginie Sully	FN	6,235	13.12%		
Liliane Blanc	FG	1,873	3.94%		
Caroline Gauthier	EELV	935	1.97%		
Stève Soria	MoDem	723	1.52%		
Patrick Bouyat	??	311	0.65%		
Aline Pornet	Communistes	213	0.45%		
Isabelle Leveque	URCID	207	0.44%		
Elisabeth Milon	LO	187	0.39%		
Véronique Logie	NPA	171	0.36%		
Valid votes		47,517	98.28%	46,688	96.66%
Spoilt and null votes		834	1.72%	1,612	3.34%
Votes cast / turnout		48,351	58.83%	48,300	58.77%
Abstentions		33,832	41.17%	33,881	41.23%
Registered voters		82,183	100.00%	82,181	100.00%

=== 2007 ===
Legislative Election 2007: Indre's 1st constituency
Party	Candidate	Votes	%	±%
UMP	Jean-Yves Hugon	13,663	41.15	+7.94
PS	Michel Sapin	10,528	31.71	−3.08
DVG	Jean-Paul Thibault	2,516	7.58	N/A
MoDem	Jacques Jacquelin	1,465	4.41	N/A
FN	Michel Hubault	1,292	3.89	−5.31
PCF	Michel Fradet	780	2.35	−1.53
LV	Patricia Danguy	731	2.20	−0.57
Others	N/A	2,225	-	−
Turnout		33,972	60.37	−4.47
2nd round result
PS	Michel Sapin	17,175	50.55	+3.52
UMP	Jean-Yves Hugon	16,801	49.45	−3.52
Turnout		35,160	62.81	−0.68
PS gain from UMP				

=== 2002 ===
Legislative Election 2002: Indre's 1st constituency
Party	Candidate	Votes	%	±%
PS	Jean-Yves Gateaud	12,130	34.79	+1.73
UMP	Jean-Yves Hugon	11,579	33.21	N/A
FN	Michel Hubault	3,207	9.20	−4.57
DVD	Patrick Serpeau	3,108	8.91	N/A
PCF	Sandrine Feuilade	1,353	3.88	−6.12
LV	Monique Lajonchère	966	2.77	−2.16
DVG	Michel Arroyo	715	2.05	N/A
Others	N/A	1,813	-	−
Turnout		35,918	64.84	−3.51
2nd round result
UMP	Jean-Yves Hugon	17,893	52.97	N/A
PS	Jean-Yves Gateaud	15,888	47.03	−6.12
Turnout		35,166	63.49	−8.98
UMP gain from PS				

=== 1997 ===
Legislative Election 1997: Indre's 1st constituency
Party	Candidate	Votes	%	±%
PS	Jean-Yves Gateaud	11,648	33.06	
FD (UDF)	Michel Blondeau	11,009	31.25	
FN	Bernard Poulain	4,850	13.77	
PCF	Aline Dolidier	3,523	10.00	
LV	Jean Delavergne	1,737	4.93	
LDI	Edouard Colin	939	2.67	
DVE	Patrick Bouyat	820	2.33	
MDC	Michèle Ballanger	704	2.00	
Turnout		37,513	68.35	
2nd round result
PS	Jean-Yves Gateaud	19,692	53.15	
FD (UDF)	Michel Blondeau	17,359	46.85	
Turnout		39,773	72.47	
PS gain from DVD				
