= Cantons of the Indre department =

The following is a list of the 13 cantons of the Indre department, in France, following the French canton reorganisation which came into effect in March 2015:

- Ardentes
- Argenton-sur-Creuse
- Le Blanc
- Buzançais
- Châteauroux-1
- Châteauroux-2
- Châteauroux-3
- La Châtre
- Issoudun
- Levroux
- Neuvy-Saint-Sépulchre
- Saint-Gaultier
- Valençay
