= 2024 French legislative election in Indre =

Following the first round of the 2024 French legislative election on 30 June 2024, runoff elections in each constituency where no candidate received a vote share greater than 50 percent were scheduled for 7 July. Candidates permitted to stand in the runoff elections needed to either come in first or second place in the first round or achieve more than 12.5 percent of the votes of the entire electorate (as opposed to 12.5 percent of the vote share due to low turnout).

== Indre ==
=== 1st constituency ===
Candidate	Party or alliance		First round		Second round	
Candidate	Party or alliance		Votes	%	Votes	%
Mylène Wunsch	National Rally		19,755	40.20	21,689	44.49
François Jolivet	Ensemble	Horizons	17,256	35.12	27,060	55.51
Eloïse Gonzalez	New Popular Front	La France Insoumise	10,658	21.69		
Véronique Gelinaud	Far-left	Lutte Ouvrière	756	1.54		
Marie-Odile Trusch	Reconquête		716	1.46		
Total			49,141	100.00	48,749	100.00
Valid votes			49,141	96.51	48,749	94.93
Invalid votes			646	1.27	876	1.71
Blank votes			1,132	2.22	1,726	3.36
Total votes			50,919	100.00	51,351	100.00
Registered voters/turnout			77,075	66.06	77,089	66.61

=== 2nd constituency ===
Candidate	Party or alliance		First round		Second round	
Candidate	Party or alliance		Votes	%	Votes	%
Marc Siffert	Union of the far right	The Republicans	24,512	41.71	27,242	47.24
Nicolas Forissier	The Republicans		18,700	31.82	30,423	52.76
Clément Sapin	New Popular Front	Socialist Party	13,783	23.46		
Damien Mercier	Far-left	Lutte Ouvrière	931	1.58		
Pierre Schwarz	Independent		836	1.42		
Total			58,762	100.00	57,665	100.00
Valid votes			58,762	96.37	57,665	94.27
Invalid votes			814	1.33	1,179	1.93
Blank votes			1,400	2.30	2,325	3.80
Total votes			60,976	100.00	61,169	100.00
Registered voters/turnout			87,371	69.79	87,371	70.01
