= Departmental Council of Indre =

Departmental legislature in France

Departmental Council of Indre Conseil départemental de l'Indre (French)
- Logo of the Council

Leadership
- President: Marc Fleuret, UDI - LC since 1 July 2021

Website
- www.indre.fr

The Departmental Council of Indre (French: Conseil départemental de l'Indre) is the deliberative assembly of the Indre department in the region of Centre-Val de Loire. It consists of 26 members (departmental councilors) from its 13 cantons and its headquarters are in Châteauroux, capital of the department.

== Executive ==
=== President ===
The president of the departmental council of Indre is Marc Fleuret (UDI-LC) since July 2021, succeeding Serge Descout (LR).

List of successive presidents
Period		Name	Party
1945	1951	Max Hymans	SFIO
1951	1975	Vincent Rotinat	PR
1975	1979	André Gasnier	MRG
1979	1985	André Laignel	PS
1985	March 1998	Daniel Bernardet	UDF
March 1998	April 1998	Albert Fréville	DVD
April 1998	2016	Louis Pinton	UMP
2016	2021	Serge Descout	LR
2021	Incumbent	Marc Fleuret	UDI-LC

=== Vice-presidents ===
List of vice-presidents of the Indre Departmental Council (as of 2021)
Order	Name	Canton (constituency)	Delegation
1st	Frédérique Mériaudeau	Buzançais	Budget, health and social dialogue
2nd	Gérard Mayaud	Saint-Gaultier	Social action and human solidarity
3rd	Florence Petipez	Châteauroux-1	Public order and sports
4th	Claude Doucet	Valençay	Tourism, culture and environment
5th	Virginie Élion	Neuvy-Saint-Sépulchre	Education and transport
6th	Gil Avérous	Châteauroux-3	Heritage and digital regional planning
7th	François Daugeron	La Châtre	Investments, roads and infrastructure

== Composition ==
The departmental council includes 26 departmental councilors elected from the 13 cantons of Indre.

Composition by party (as of 2021)
Party	Acronym	Seats	Groups
Majority (21 seats)
Miscellaneous right	DVD	12	Departmental majority
The Republicans and allies	LR	6	Departmental majority
Miscellaneous centre	DVC	3	Departmental majority
Opposition (4 seats)
Miscellaneous left	DVG	2	Ensemble pour l'Indre
The Ecologists and allies	EELV	1	Ensemble pour l'Indre
Socialist Party and allies	PS	1	Ensemble pour l'Indre
