= Jean-Yves Hugon =

French politician (1949–2026)

Deputy of the French National Assembly for Indre's 1st constituency
- In office 19 June 2002 – 19 June 2007
- Preceded by: Jean-Yves Gateaud
- Succeeded by: Michel Sapin

Member of the Departmental Council of Indre for the Canton of Châteauroux-2
- In office 2 April 2015 – 24 April 2026
- Preceded by: canton established
- Succeeded by: TBD

Personal details
- Born: 16 May 1949 Aurillac, France
- Died: 24 April 2026 (aged 76) Châteauroux, France
- Party: UMP
- Occupation: Teacher

Jean-Yves Hugon (French: [ʒˈɑ̃-ˈiv yɡˈɔ̃]; 16 May 1949 – 24 April 2026) was a French politician of the Union for a Popular Movement (UMP).

== Life and career ==
Born in Aurillac on 16 May 1949, Hugon first worked as a German teacher before entering politics in 2001. That year, he was elected to the municipal council of Châteauroux under mayor Jean-François Mayet. He served as Deputy Mayor of Sport, International Relations, and Sister Cities from 2008 to 2014 before serving as First Deputy Mayor from 2014 to 2020.

In 2002, Hugon was elected as a deputy of the National Assembly, representing Indre's 1st constituency. There, he was a member of the National Defence and Armed Forces Committee. In 2007, he was defeated in the second round by 374 votes against Michel Sapin. In 2009, he ran for a seat in the European Parliament under the UMP group led by Jean-Pierre Audy, but he was unsuccessful. In 2012, he was unable to secure the UMP's nomination for Indre's 1st constituency in the National Assembly, which instead went to François Jolivet.

In 2015, Hugon was elected to the Departmental Council of Indre, representing the Canton of Châteauroux-2 alongside Imane Jbara-Sounni.

Hugon died in Châteauroux on 24 April 2026, at the age of 76.
