= Alix Fruchon =

French politician (born 1994)

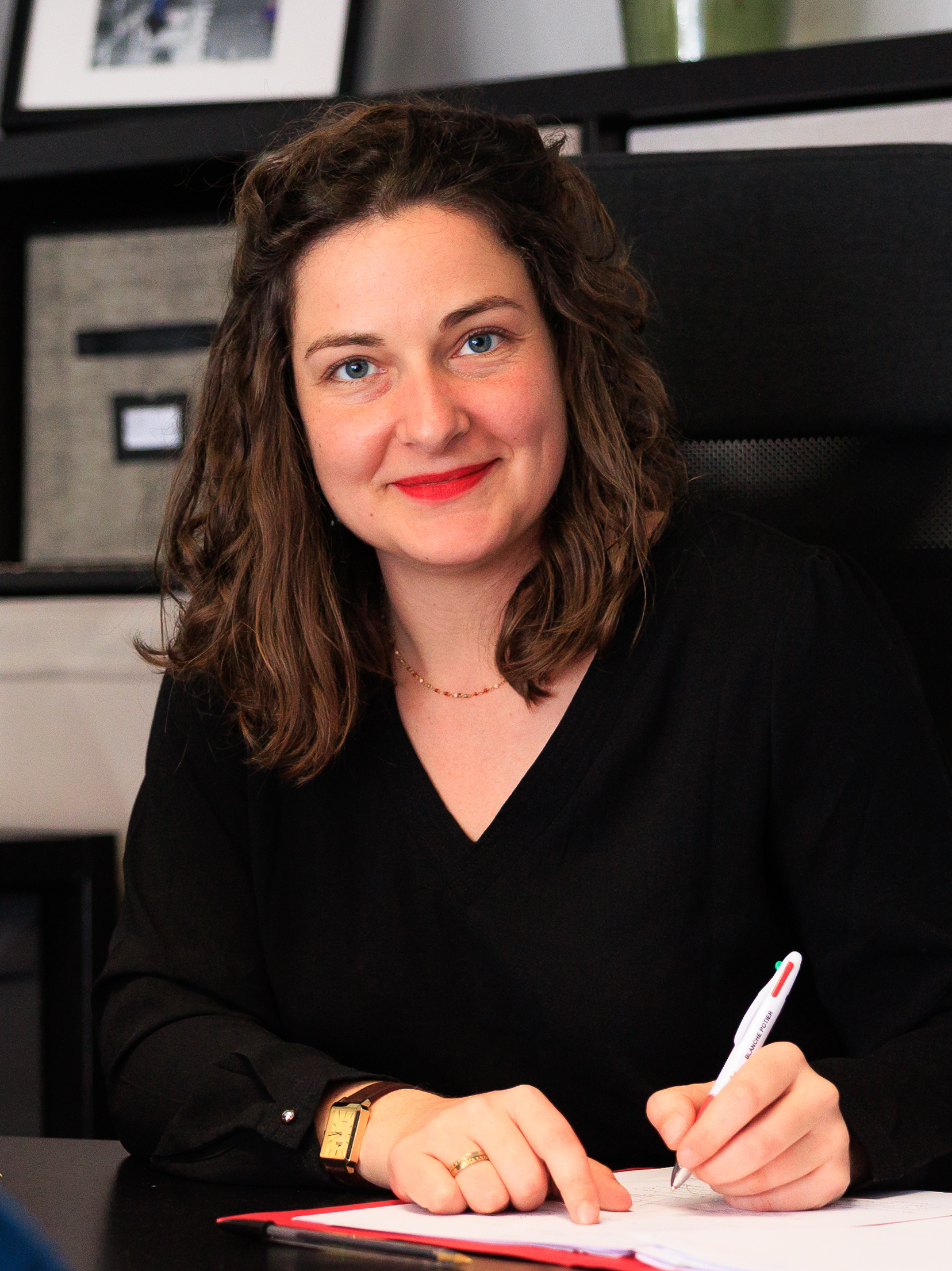
- Fruchon in 2025

Member of the National Assembly
- Incumbent
- Assumed office 13 November 2025
- Preceded by: Nicolas Forissier
- Constituency: Indre's 2nd constituency

Personal details
- Born: 14 October 1994 (age 31)
- Party: The Republicans

Alix Fruchon (born 14 October 1994) is a French politician serving as a member of the National Assembly since 2025. She has been a municipal councillor of Châteauroux since 2020. In the 2022 legislative election, she was a candidate for Indre's 1st constituency.
