= Jean-Paul Chanteguet =

French politician

Jean-Paul Chanteguet (born 9 December 1949 in Le Blanc, Indre) was a member of the National Assembly of France from 1988 to 1993, and again from 1997 to 2017. He represented the Indre department, first the 3rd and then the 1st constituency, was a member of the Socialiste, radical, citoyen et divers gauche and was particularly engaged on environmental issues.
