= Étrechet =

- Commune
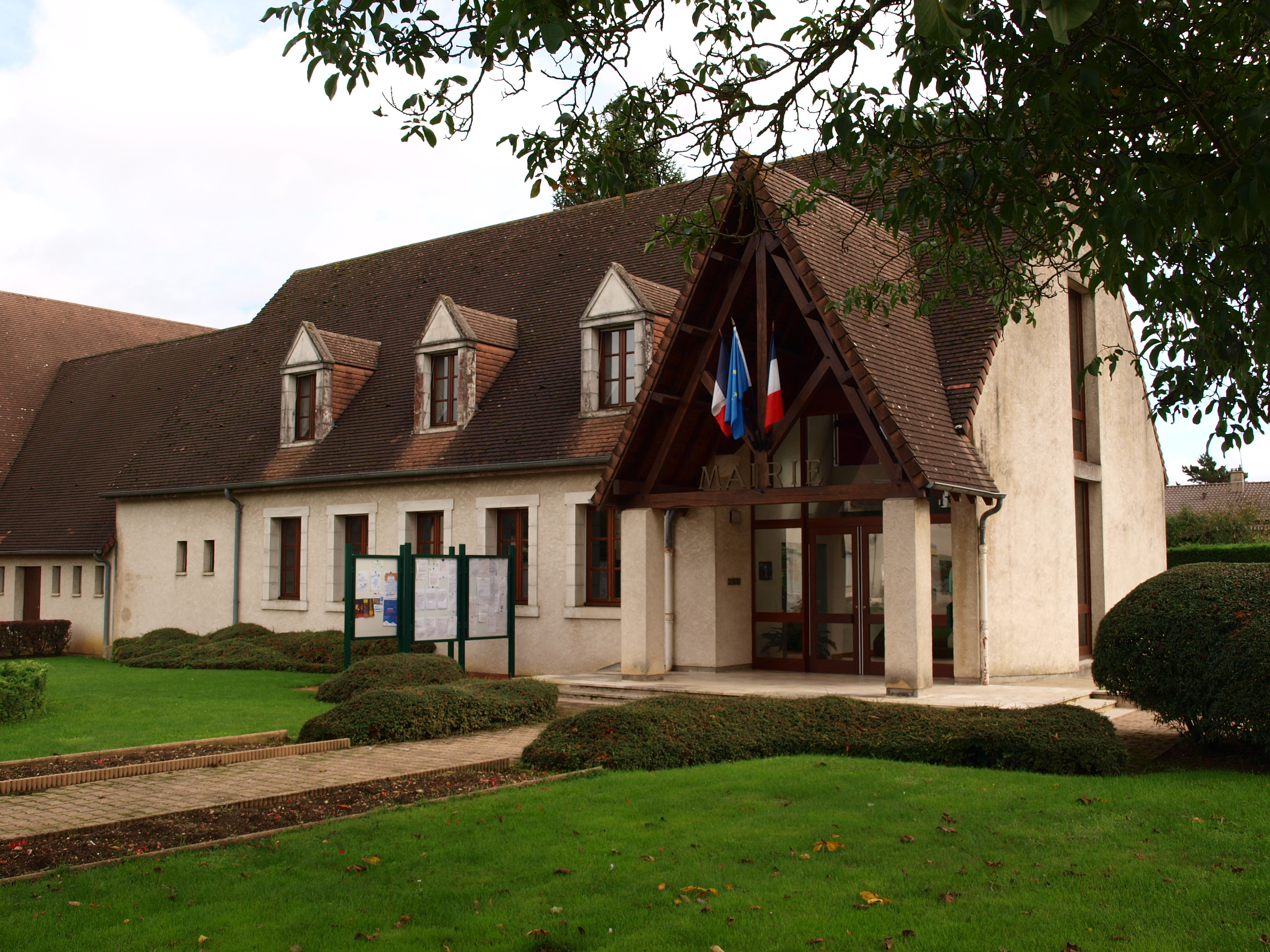
- The town hall in Étrechet
- Location of Étrechet
- Location within France Location within Centre-Val de Loire
- Coordinates: 46°46′46″N 1°47′08″E
- Country: France
- Region: Centre-Val de Loire
- Department: Indre
- Arrondissement: Châteauroux
- Canton: Ardentes
- Intercommunality: CA Châteauroux Métropole

Government
  - Mayor (2020–2026): Marc Descouraux
- Area^{1}: 17.89 km^{2} (6.91 sq mi)
- Elevation: 163 m (535 ft)
- Highest elevation: 167 m (548 ft)
- Lowest elevation: 145 m (476 ft)
- Population (2023): 998
  - Density: 55.8/km^{2} (144/sq mi)
- Time zone: UTC+01:00 (CET)
  - Summer (DST): UTC+02:00 (CEST)
- INSEE/Postal code: 36071 /36120
- ^{1} French Land Register data, which excludes lakes, ponds, glaciers > 1 km^{2} (0.386 sq mi or 247 acres) and river estuaries.

Étrechet (French pronunciation: [etʁəʃɛ]) is a commune in the Indre department in central France.

== Population ==
Historical population
| Year | Pop. | ±% p.a. |
|---|---|---|
| 1968 | 349 | — |
| 1975 | 620 | +8.56% |
| 1982 | 926 | +5.90% |
| 1990 | 872 | −0.75% |
| 1999 | 802 | −0.93% |
| 2007 | 849 | +0.71% |
| 2012 | 905 | +1.29% |
| 2017 | 1,008 | +2.18% |
| 2023 | 998 | −0.17% |
Source: INSEE

== See also ==
- Communes of the Indre department
