= Coings =

- Commune
- Location of Coings
- Location within France Location within Centre-Val de Loire
- Coordinates: 46°53′14″N 1°42′59″E
- Country: France
- Region: Centre-Val de Loire
- Department: Indre
- Arrondissement: Châteauroux
- Canton: Levroux
- Intercommunality: CA Châteauroux Métropole

Government
  - Mayor (2023–2026): Jean-François Morin
- Area^{1}: 29.33 km^{2} (11.32 sq mi)
- Elevation: 158 m (518 ft)
- Highest elevation: 171 m (561 ft)
- Lowest elevation: 145 m (476 ft)
- Population (2023): 915
  - Density: 31.2/km^{2} (80.8/sq mi)
- Time zone: UTC+01:00 (CET)
  - Summer (DST): UTC+02:00 (CEST)
- INSEE/Postal code: 36057 /36130
- ^{1} French Land Register data, which excludes lakes, ponds, glaciers > 1 km^{2} (0.386 sq mi or 247 acres) and river estuaries.

Coings (French pronunciation: [kwɛ̃]) is a commune in the Indre department in central France.

== Population ==
Historical population
Year	Pop.	±% p.a.
1968	446	—
1975	479	+1.02%
1982	762	+6.86%
1990	821	+0.94%
1999	815	−0.08%
2007	865	+0.75%
2012	813	−1.23%
2017	880	+1.60%
2023	915	+0.65%
Source: INSEE

== See also ==
- Communes of the Indre department
