= Vouillon =

- Commune
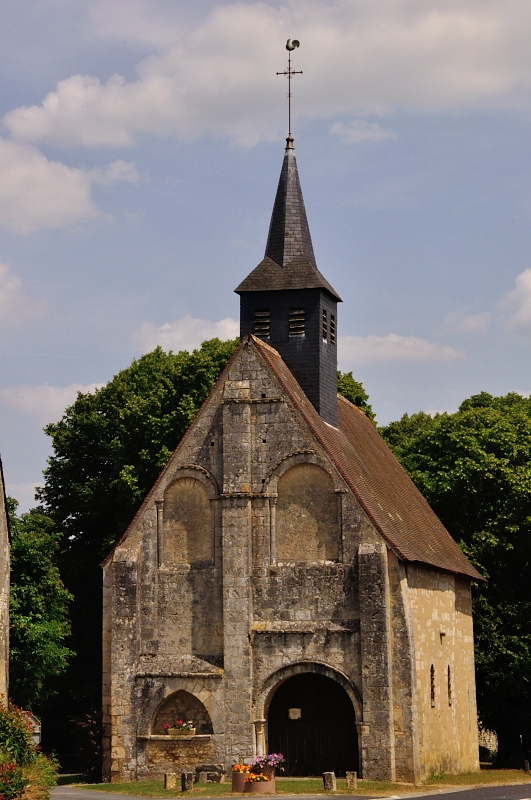
- The church of Saint-Saturnin, in Vouillon
- Location of Vouillon
- Location within France Location within Centre-Val de Loire
- Coordinates: 46°49′21″N 1°55′32″E
- Country: France
- Region: Centre-Val de Loire
- Department: Indre
- Arrondissement: Issoudun
- Canton: Ardentes
- Intercommunality: Champagne Boischauts

Government
  - Mayor (2020–2026): Yves Prévot
- Area^{1}: 14.98 km^{2} (5.78 sq mi)
- Elevation: 160 m (520 ft)
- Highest elevation: 171 m (561 ft)
- Lowest elevation: 142 m (466 ft)
- Population (2023): 220
  - Density: 15/km^{2} (38/sq mi)
- Time zone: UTC+01:00 (CET)
  - Summer (DST): UTC+02:00 (CEST)
- INSEE/Postal code: 36248 /36100
- ^{1} French Land Register data, which excludes lakes, ponds, glaciers > 1 km^{2} (0.386 sq mi or 247 acres) and river estuaries.

Vouillon is a commune in the Indre department in central France.

== Population ==
Historical population
Year	Pop.	±% p.a.
1968	257	—
1975	228	−1.70%
1982	236	+0.49%
1990	289	+2.56%
1999	250	−1.60%
2007	262	+0.59%
2012	249	−1.01%
2017	234	−1.23%
2023	220	−1.02%
Source: INSEE

The inhabitants of the town of Vouillon are called Vouillonnais in French.

== See also ==
- Communes of the Indre department
