= Arthon =

- Commune
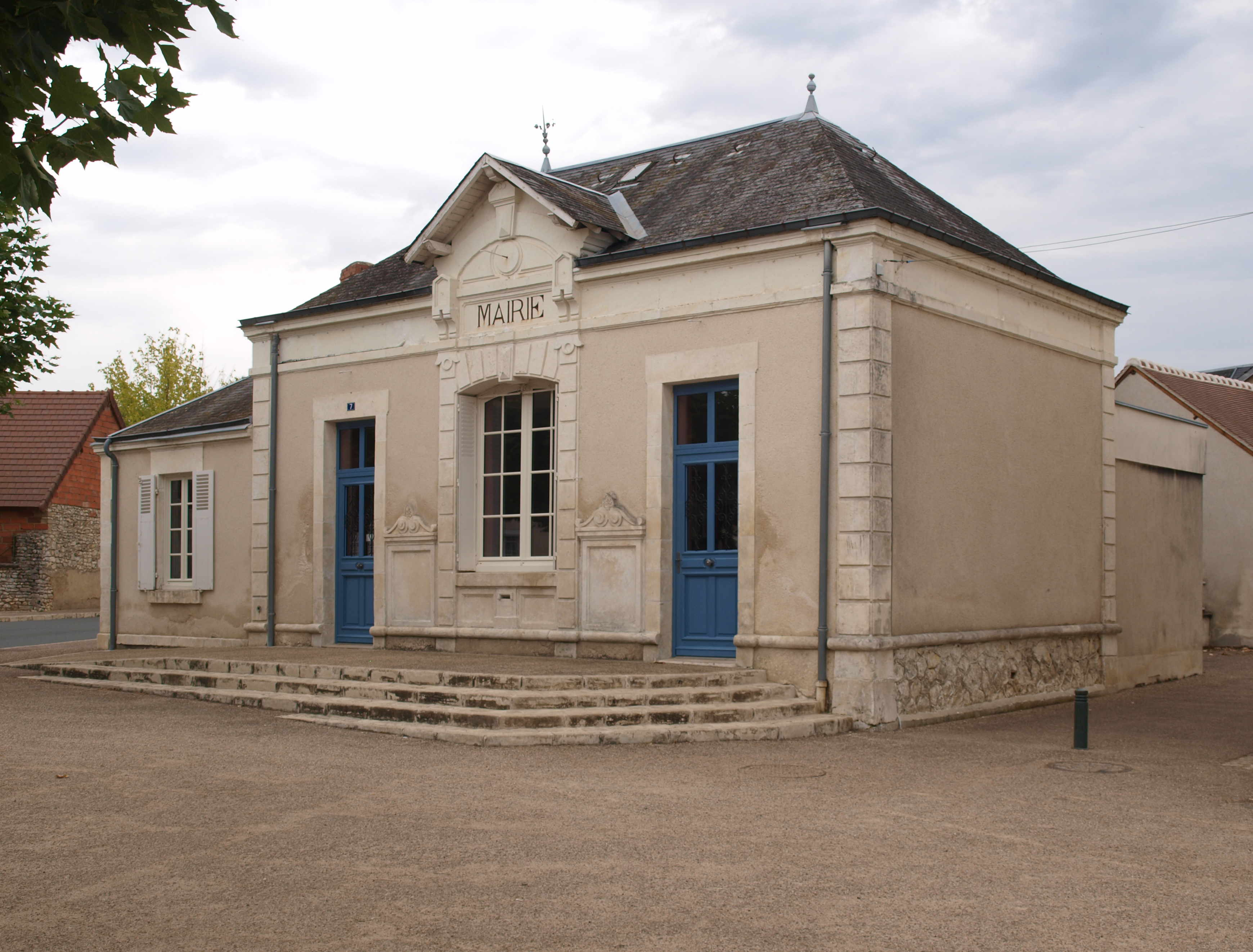
- The town hall in Arthon
- Location of Arthon
- Location within France Location within Centre-Val de Loire
- Coordinates: 46°41′40″N 1°42′01″E
- Country: France
- Region: Centre-Val de Loire
- Department: Indre
- Arrondissement: Châteauroux
- Canton: Ardentes
- Intercommunality: CA Châteauroux Métropole

Government
  - Mayor (2020–2026): Pascale Bavouzet
- Area^{1}: 46.8 km^{2} (18.1 sq mi)
- Elevation: 145 m (476 ft)
- Highest elevation: 184 m (604 ft)
- Lowest elevation: 132 m (433 ft)
- Population (2023): 1,215
  - Density: 26.0/km^{2} (67.2/sq mi)
- Time zone: UTC+01:00 (CET)
  - Summer (DST): UTC+02:00 (CEST)
- INSEE/Postal code: 36009 /36330
- ^{1} French Land Register data, which excludes lakes, ponds, glaciers > 1 km^{2} (0.386 sq mi or 247 acres) and river estuaries.

Arthon (French pronunciation: [aʁtɔ̃]) is a commune in the Indre department in central France.

== Geography ==
The commune is traversed by the river Bouzanne.

== Population ==
Historical population
Year	Pop.	±% p.a.
1968	532	—
1975	558	+0.68%
1982	751	+4.33%
1990	902	+2.32%
1999	995	+1.10%
2007	1,063	+0.83%
2012	1,209	+2.61%
2017	1,250	+0.67%
2023	1,215	−0.47%
Source: INSEE

== See also ==
- Communes of the Indre department
