= Arrondissements of the Indre department =

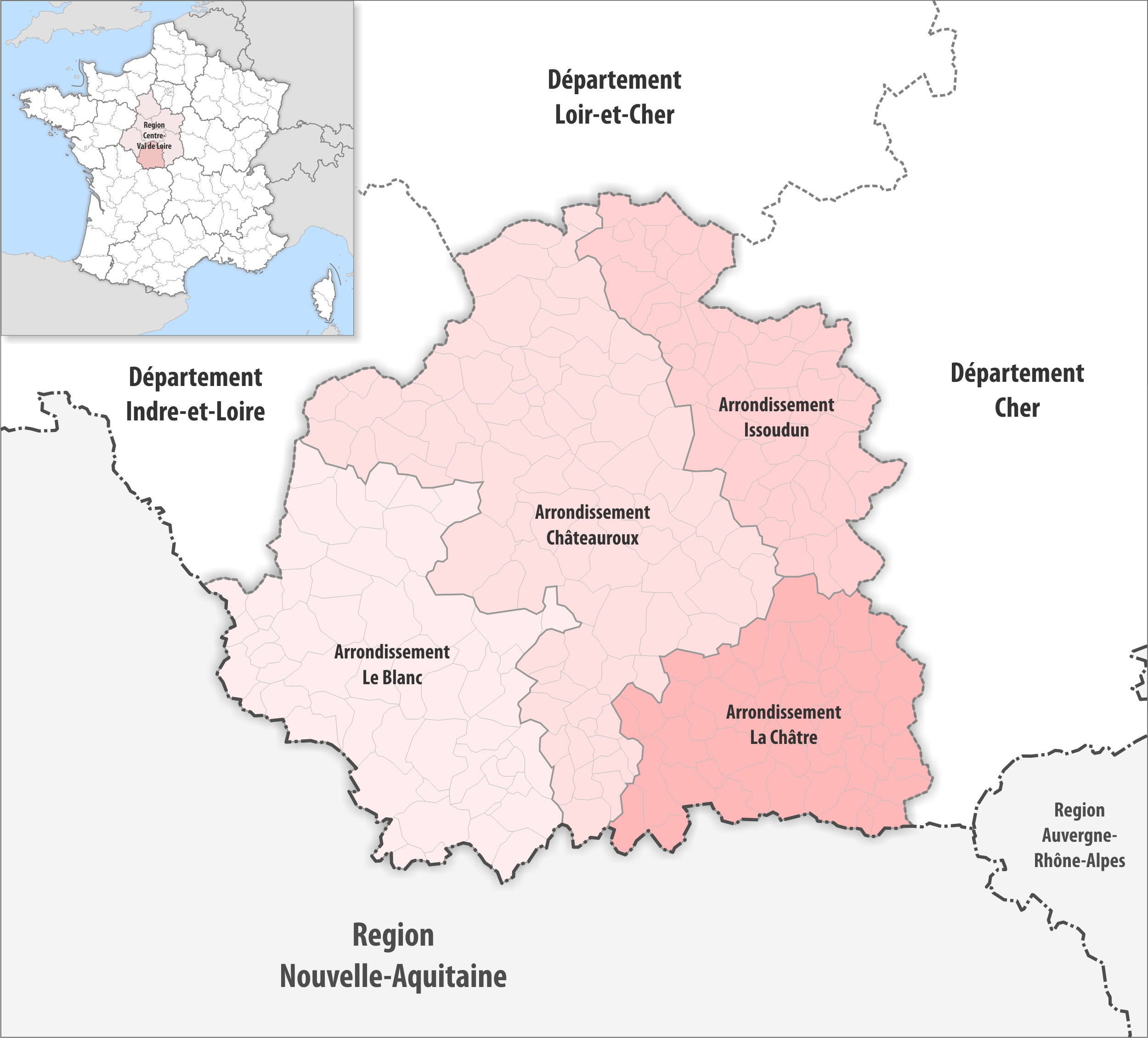
Map of arrondissements of the Indre department.

The 4 arrondissements of the Indre department are:

1. Arrondissement of Le Blanc, (subprefecture: Le Blanc) with 57 communes. The population of the arrondissement was 30,501 in 2021.
2. Arrondissement of Châteauroux, (prefecture of the Indre department: Châteauroux) with 84 communes. The population of the arrondissement was 126,377 in 2021.
3. Arrondissement of La Châtre, (subprefecture: La Châtre) with 51 communes. The population of the arrondissement was 27,656 in 2021.
4. Arrondissement of Issoudun, (subprefecture: Issoudun) with 49 communes. The population of the arrondissement was 32,694 in 2021.

== History ==
In 1800 the arrondissements of Châteauroux, Le Blanc, La Châtre and Issoudun were established. The arrondissement of Issoudun was disbanded in 1926, and restored in 1942.

The borders of the arrondissements of Indre were modified in January 2017:

- one commune from the arrondissement of Châteauroux to the arrondissement of Le Blanc
- one commune from the arrondissement of Châteauroux to the arrondissement of La Châtre
- eight communes from the arrondissement of La Châtre to the arrondissement of Châteauroux
