= Jeu-les-Bois =

- Commune
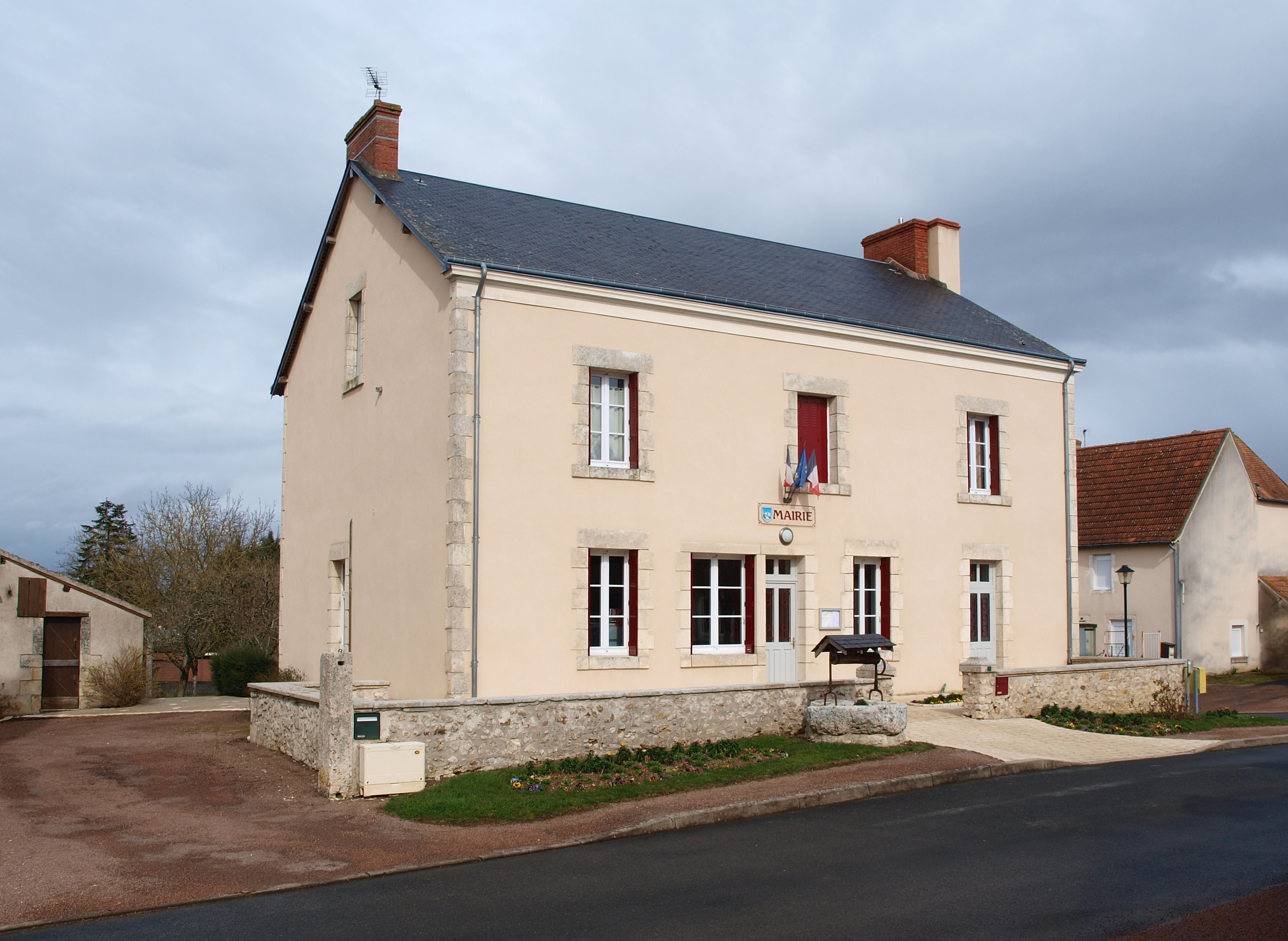
- The town hall in Jeu-les-Bois
- Location of Jeu-les-Bois
- Location within France Location within Centre-Val de Loire
- Coordinates: 46°40′27″N 1°47′45″E
- Country: France
- Region: Centre-Val de Loire
- Department: Indre
- Arrondissement: Châteauroux
- Canton: Ardentes
- Intercommunality: CA Châteauroux Métropole

Government
  - Mayor (2020–2026): Jacques Breuillaud
- Area^{1}: 38.32 km^{2} (14.80 sq mi)
- Elevation: 171 m (561 ft)
- Highest elevation: 206 m (676 ft)
- Lowest elevation: 143 m (469 ft)
- Population (2023): 404
  - Density: 10.5/km^{2} (27.3/sq mi)
- Time zone: UTC+01:00 (CET)
  - Summer (DST): UTC+02:00 (CEST)
- INSEE/Postal code: 36089 /36120
- ^{1} French Land Register data, which excludes lakes, ponds, glaciers > 1 km^{2} (0.386 sq mi or 247 acres) and river estuaries.

Jeu-les-Bois (French pronunciation: [ʒø le bwa]) is a commune in the Indre department in central France.

== Geography ==
The commune is traversed by the river Bouzanne.

== Population ==
Historical population
Year	Pop.	±% p.a.
1968	343	—
1975	260	−3.88%
1982	290	+1.57%
1990	335	+1.82%
1999	343	+0.26%
2007	361	+0.64%
2012	384	+1.24%
2017	394	+0.52%
2023	404	+0.42%
Source: INSEE

== See also ==
- Communes of the Indre department
