= Sainte-Fauste =

- Commune
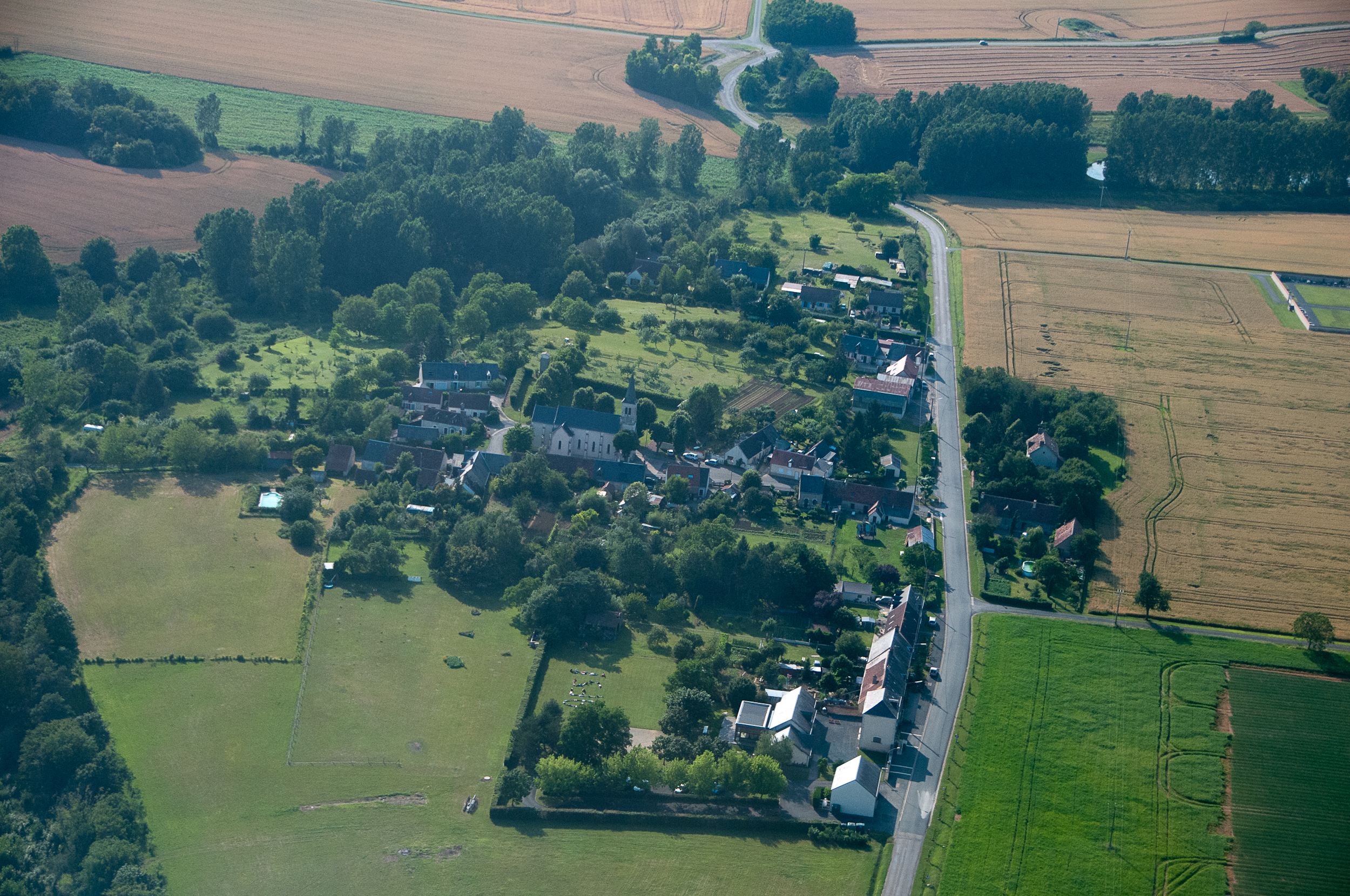
- An aerial view of Sainte-Fauste
- Location of Sainte-Fauste
- Location within France Location within Centre-Val de Loire
- Coordinates: 46°51′29″N 1°51′58″E
- Country: France
- Region: Centre-Val de Loire
- Department: Indre
- Arrondissement: Issoudun
- Canton: Ardentes
- Intercommunality: Champagne Boischauts

Government
  - Mayor (2020–2026): Jean-Marc Brunaud
- Area^{1}: 23.07 km^{2} (8.91 sq mi)
- Elevation: 141 m (463 ft)
- Highest elevation: 168 m (551 ft)
- Lowest elevation: 142 m (466 ft)
- Population (2023): 256
  - Density: 11.1/km^{2} (28.7/sq mi)
- Time zone: UTC+01:00 (CET)
  - Summer (DST): UTC+02:00 (CEST)
- INSEE/Postal code: 36190 /36100
- ^{1} French Land Register data, which excludes lakes, ponds, glaciers > 1 km^{2} (0.386 sq mi or 247 acres) and river estuaries.

Sainte-Fauste (French pronunciation: [sɛ̃t fost]) is a commune in the Indre department in central France.

== Population ==
Historical population
Year	Pop.	±% p.a.
1968	256	—
1975	218	−2.27%
1982	230	+0.77%
1990	229	−0.05%
1999	254	+1.16%
2007	270	+0.77%
2012	291	+1.51%
2017	274	−1.20%
2023	256	−1.13%
Source: INSEE

== See also ==
- Communes of the Indre department
