= Ambrault =

- Commune
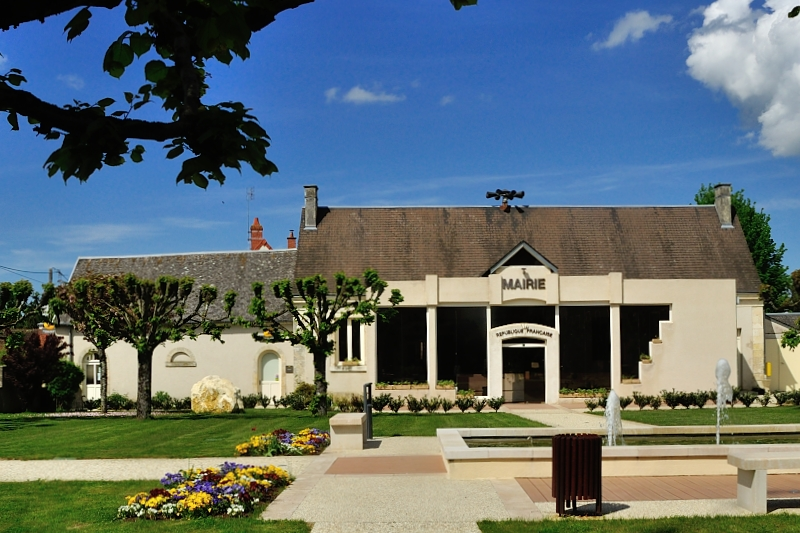
- The town hall in Ambrault
- Location of Ambrault
- Location within France Location within Centre-Val de Loire
- Coordinates: 46°47′00″N 1°58′00″E
- Country: France
- Region: Centre-Val de Loire
- Department: Indre
- Arrondissement: Issoudun
- Canton: Ardentes
- Intercommunality: Champagne Boischauts

Government
  - Mayor (2020–2026): Étienne Aujard
- Area^{1}: 25.59 km^{2} (9.88 sq mi)
- Elevation: 168 m (551 ft)
- Highest elevation: 1,206 m (3,957 ft)
- Lowest elevation: 143 m (469 ft)
- Population (2023): 884
  - Density: 34.5/km^{2} (89.5/sq mi)
- Time zone: UTC+01:00 (CET)
  - Summer (DST): UTC+02:00 (CEST)
- INSEE/Postal code: 36003 /36120
- ^{1} French Land Register data, which excludes lakes, ponds, glaciers > 1 km^{2} (0.386 sq mi or 247 acres) and river estuaries.

Ambrault (French pronunciation: [ɑ̃bʁo]) is a commune in the Indre department in central France.

== Population ==
Historical population
Year	Pop.	±% p.a.
1968	692	—
1975	614	−1.69%
1982	642	+0.64%
1990	669	+0.52%
1999	715	+0.74%
2007	840	+2.03%
2012	950	+2.49%
2017	894	−1.21%
2023	884	−0.19%
Source: INSEE

== See also ==
- Communes of the Indre department
