= Châteauroux Métropole =

- Communauté d'agglomération
- Interactive map of Châteauroux Métropole
- Coordinates: 46°47′N 01°45′E
- Country: France
- Region: Centre-Val de Loire
- Department: Indre
- No. of communes: {{{nbcomm}}}
- Established: 2000
- Area: 537.9 km^{2} (207.7 sq mi)
- Population (2019): 72,767
  - Density: 135.3/km^{2} (350.4/sq mi)
- Website: www.chateauroux-metropole.fr

Châteauroux Métropole is the communauté d'agglomération, an intercommunal structure, centred on the city of Châteauroux. It is located in the Indre department, in the Centre-Val de Loire region, central France. Created in 2000, its seat is in Châteauroux. Its area is 537.9 km^{2}. Its population was 72,767 in 2019, of which 43,122 in Châteauroux proper.

== Composition ==
The communauté d'agglomération consists of the following 14 communes:

1. Ardentes
2. Arthon
3. Châteauroux
4. Coings
5. Déols
6. Diors
7. Étrechet
8. Jeu-les-Bois
9. Luant
10. Mâron
11. Montierchaume
12. Le Poinçonnet
13. Saint-Maur
14. Sassierges-Saint-Germain
