= Sassierges-Saint-Germain =

- Commune
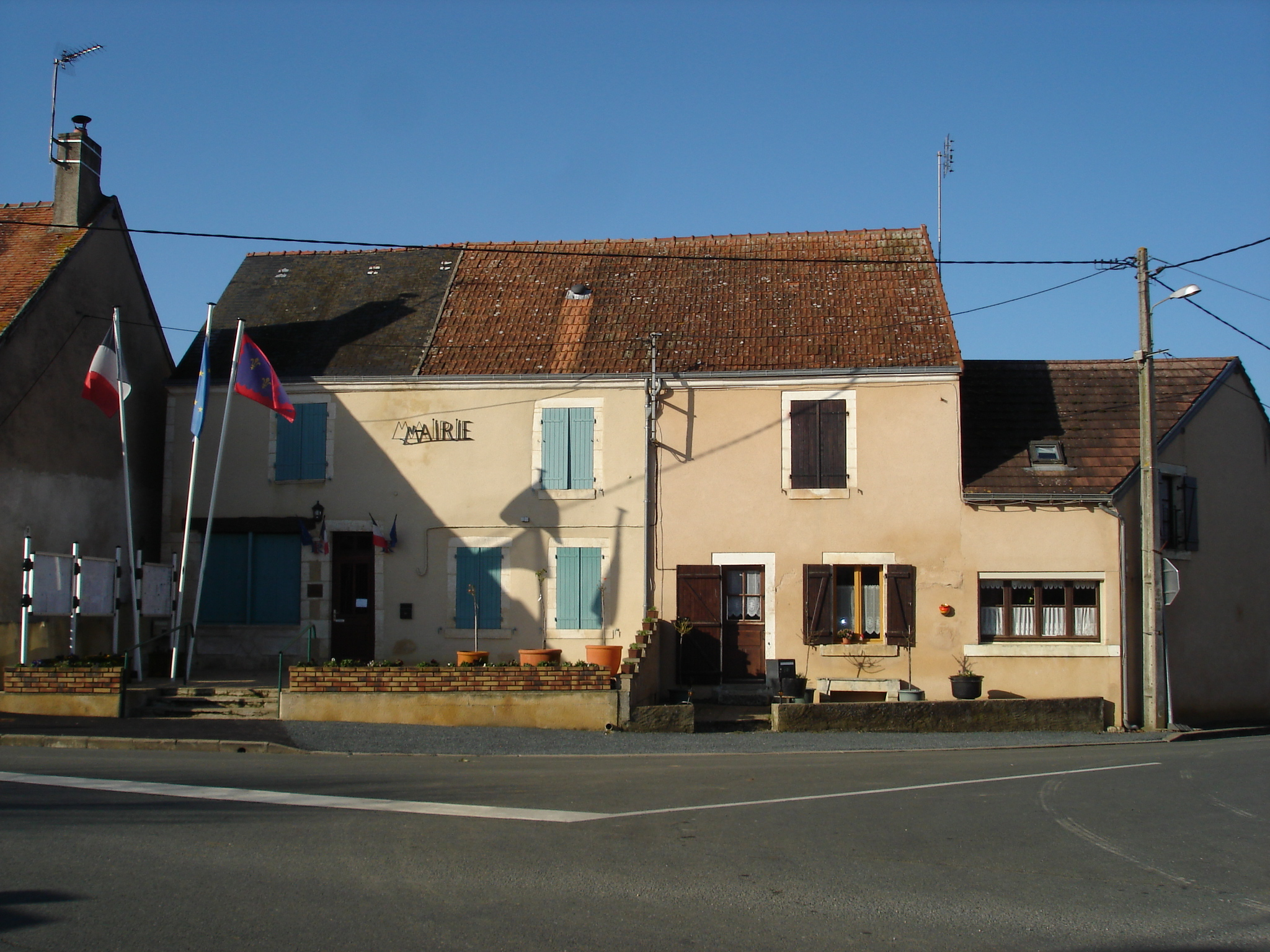
- The town hall in Sassierges-Saint-Germain

- Coat of arms
- Location of Sassierges-Saint-Germain
- Location within France Location within Centre-Val de Loire
- Coordinates: 46°46′12″N 1°53′42″E
- Country: France
- Region: Centre-Val de Loire
- Department: Indre
- Arrondissement: Châteauroux
- Canton: Ardentes
- Intercommunality: CA Châteauroux Métropole

Government
  - Mayor (2021–2026): Henri Lory
- Area^{1}: 31.72 km^{2} (12.25 sq mi)
- Elevation: 162 m (531 ft)
- Highest elevation: 217 m (712 ft)
- Lowest elevation: 148 m (486 ft)
- Population (2023): 448
  - Density: 14.1/km^{2} (36.6/sq mi)
- Time zone: UTC+01:00 (CET)
  - Summer (DST): UTC+02:00 (CEST)
- INSEE/Postal code: 36211 /36120
- ^{1} French Land Register data, which excludes lakes, ponds, glaciers > 1 km^{2} (0.386 sq mi or 247 acres) and river estuaries.

Sassierges-Saint-Germain (French pronunciation: [sa sjɛʁʒ sɛ̃ ʒɛʁmɛ̃]) is a commune in the Indre department in central France.

== Population ==
Historical population
Year	Pop.	±% p.a.
1968	330	—
1975	331	+0.04%
1982	355	+1.01%
1990	386	+1.05%
1999	407	+0.59%
2007	457	+1.46%
2012	477	+0.86%
2017	477	+0.00%
2023	448	−1.04%
Source: INSEE

== See also ==
- Communes of the Indre department
