= Diors =

- Commune
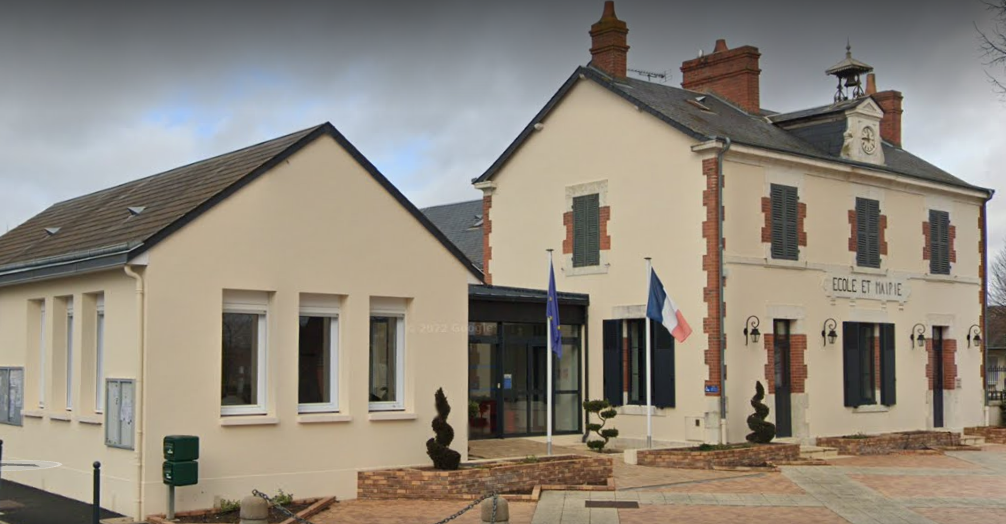
- Diors Town hall
- Location of Diors
- Location within France Location within Centre-Val de Loire
- Coordinates: 46°49′38″N 1°48′56″E
- Country: France
- Region: Centre-Val de Loire
- Department: Indre
- Arrondissement: Châteauroux
- Canton: Ardentes
- Intercommunality: CA Châteauroux Métropole

Government
  - Mayor (2020–2026): Christian Baron
- Area^{1}: 25.44 km^{2} (9.82 sq mi)
- Elevation: 162 m (531 ft)
- Highest elevation: 167 m (548 ft)
- Lowest elevation: 149 m (489 ft)
- Population (2023): 756
  - Density: 29.7/km^{2} (77.0/sq mi)
- Time zone: UTC+01:00 (CET)
  - Summer (DST): UTC+02:00 (CEST)
- INSEE/Postal code: 36064 /36130
- ^{1} French Land Register data, which excludes lakes, ponds, glaciers > 1 km^{2} (0.386 sq mi or 247 acres) and river estuaries.

Diors (French pronunciation: [djɔʁ]) is a commune in the Indre department in central France.

== Population ==
Historical population
Year	Pop.	±% p.a.
1968	291	—
1975	266	−1.28%
1982	546	+10.82%
1990	617	+1.54%
1999	676	+1.02%
2007	761	+1.49%
2012	705	−1.52%
2017	785	+2.17%
2023	756	−0.63%
Source: INSEE

== See also ==
- Communes of the Indre department
