= Ardentes =

- Commune
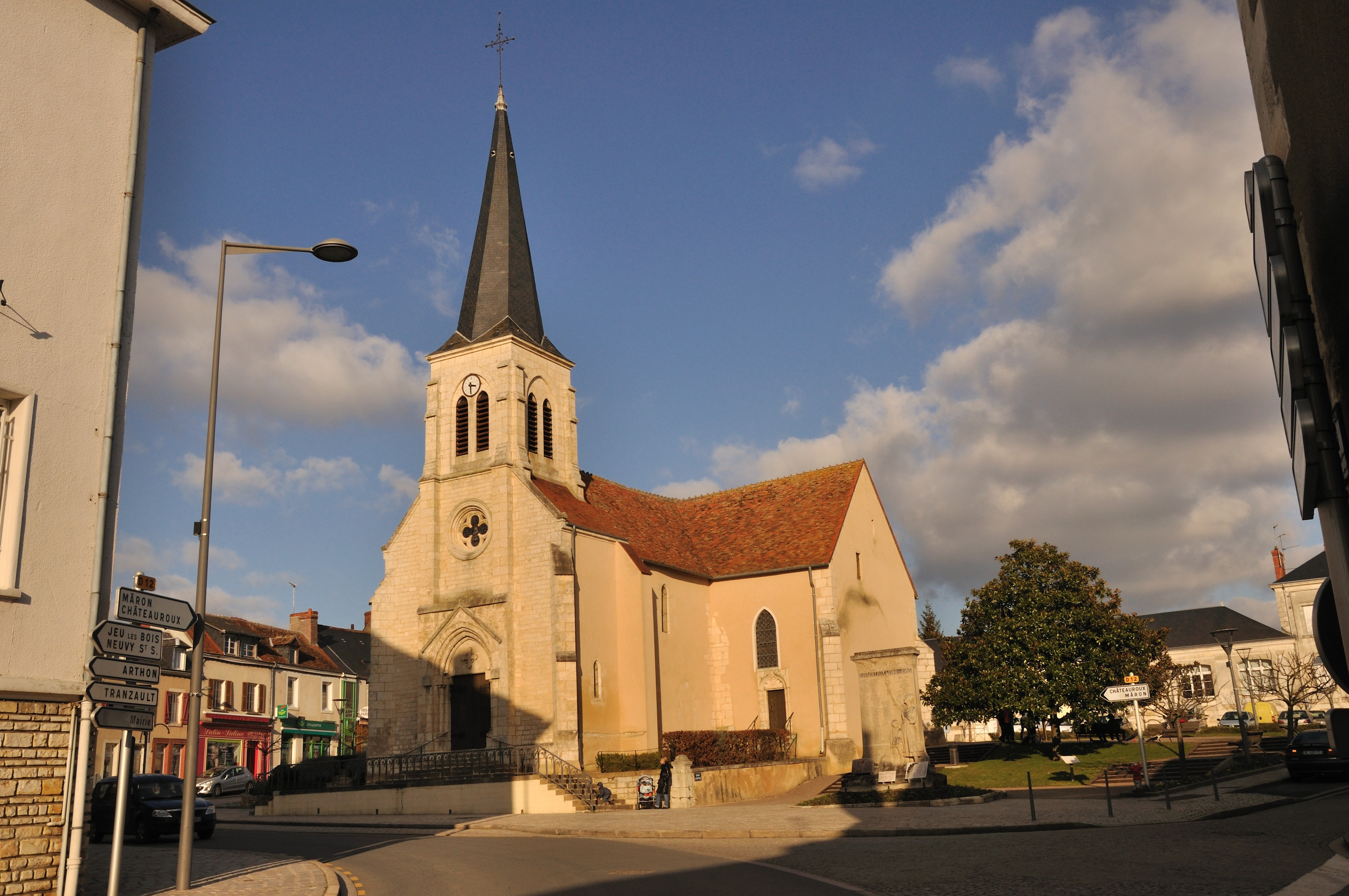
- The church and the Place de la République, in Ardentes

- Coat of arms
- Location of Ardentes
- Location within France Location within Centre-Val de Loire
- Coordinates: 46°44′35″N 1°49′54″E
- Country: France
- Region: Centre-Val de Loire
- Department: Indre
- Arrondissement: Châteauroux
- Canton: Ardentes
- Intercommunality: CA Châteauroux Métropole

Government
  - Mayor (2020–2026): Gilles Caranton
- Area^{1}: 62.09 km^{2} (23.97 sq mi)
- Elevation: 163 m (535 ft)
- Highest elevation: 208 m (682 ft)
- Lowest elevation: 150 m (490 ft)
- Population (2023): 3,715
  - Density: 59.83/km^{2} (155.0/sq mi)
- Time zone: UTC+01:00 (CET)
  - Summer (DST): UTC+02:00 (CEST)
- INSEE/Postal code: 36005 /36120
- ^{1} French Land Register data, which excludes lakes, ponds, glaciers > 1 km^{2} (0.386 sq mi or 247 acres) and river estuaries.

Ardentes (French pronunciation: [aʁdɑ̃t]) is a commune in the department of Indre, region of Centre-Val de Loire, France. The archaeologist Jean Hubert (1902–1994) was born in Ardentes.

== Population ==
Historical population

Year	Pop.	±% p.a.
1793	1,056	—
1800	1,002	−0.75%
1806	909	−1.61%
1821	1,179	+1.75%
1831	1,144	−0.30%
1836	1,089	−0.98%
1841	2,162	+14.70%
1846	2,297	+1.22%
1851	2,480	+1.54%
1856	2,546	+0.53%
1861	2,561	+0.12%
1866	2,681	+0.92%
1872	2,449	−1.50%
1876	2,617	+1.67%
1881	2,682	+0.49%
1886	2,647	−0.26%
1891	2,677	+0.23%
1896	2,665	−0.09%
1901	2,655	−0.08%

Year	Pop.	±% p.a.
1906	2,679	+0.18%
1911	2,725	+0.34%
1921	2,504	−0.84%
1926	2,327	−1.46%
1931	2,237	−0.79%
1936	2,247	+0.09%
1946	2,710	+1.89%
1954	2,725	+0.07%
1962	2,852	+0.57%
1968	2,720	−0.79%
1975	2,780	+0.31%
1982	3,269	+2.34%
1990	3,511	+0.90%
1999	3,323	−0.61%
2007	3,616	+1.06%
2012	3,799	+0.99%
2017	3,860	+0.32%
2023	3,715	−0.64%

Source: EHESS and INSEE (1968-2023)

== See also ==
- Communes of the Indre department
