= Montierchaume =

- Commune
- Location of Montierchaume
- Location within France Location within Centre-Val de Loire
- Coordinates: 46°51′50″N 1°46′36″E
- Country: France
- Region: Centre-Val de Loire
- Department: Indre
- Arrondissement: Châteauroux
- Canton: Ardentes
- Intercommunality: CA Châteauroux Métropole

Government
  - Mayor (2022–2026): Philippe Guerineau
- Area^{1}: 37.2 km^{2} (14.4 sq mi)
- Elevation: 160 m (520 ft)
- Highest elevation: 169 m (554 ft)
- Lowest elevation: 144 m (472 ft)
- Population (2023): 1,624
  - Density: 43.7/km^{2} (113/sq mi)
- Time zone: UTC+01:00 (CET)
  - Summer (DST): UTC+02:00 (CEST)
- INSEE/Postal code: 36128 /36130
- ^{1} French Land Register data, which excludes lakes, ponds, glaciers > 1 km^{2} (0.386 sq mi or 247 acres) and river estuaries.

Montierchaume (French pronunciation: [mɔ̃tjɛʁʃom]) is a commune in the Indre department, central France.

== Population ==
Historical population
Year	Pop.	±% p.a.
1968	702	—
1975	1,001	+5.20%
1982	1,325	+4.09%
1990	1,752	+3.55%
1999	1,757	+0.03%
2007	1,677	−0.58%
2012	1,648	−0.35%
2017	1,643	−0.06%
2023	1,624	−0.19%
Source: INSEE

== See also ==
- Communes of the Indre department
