= Mâron =

- Commune
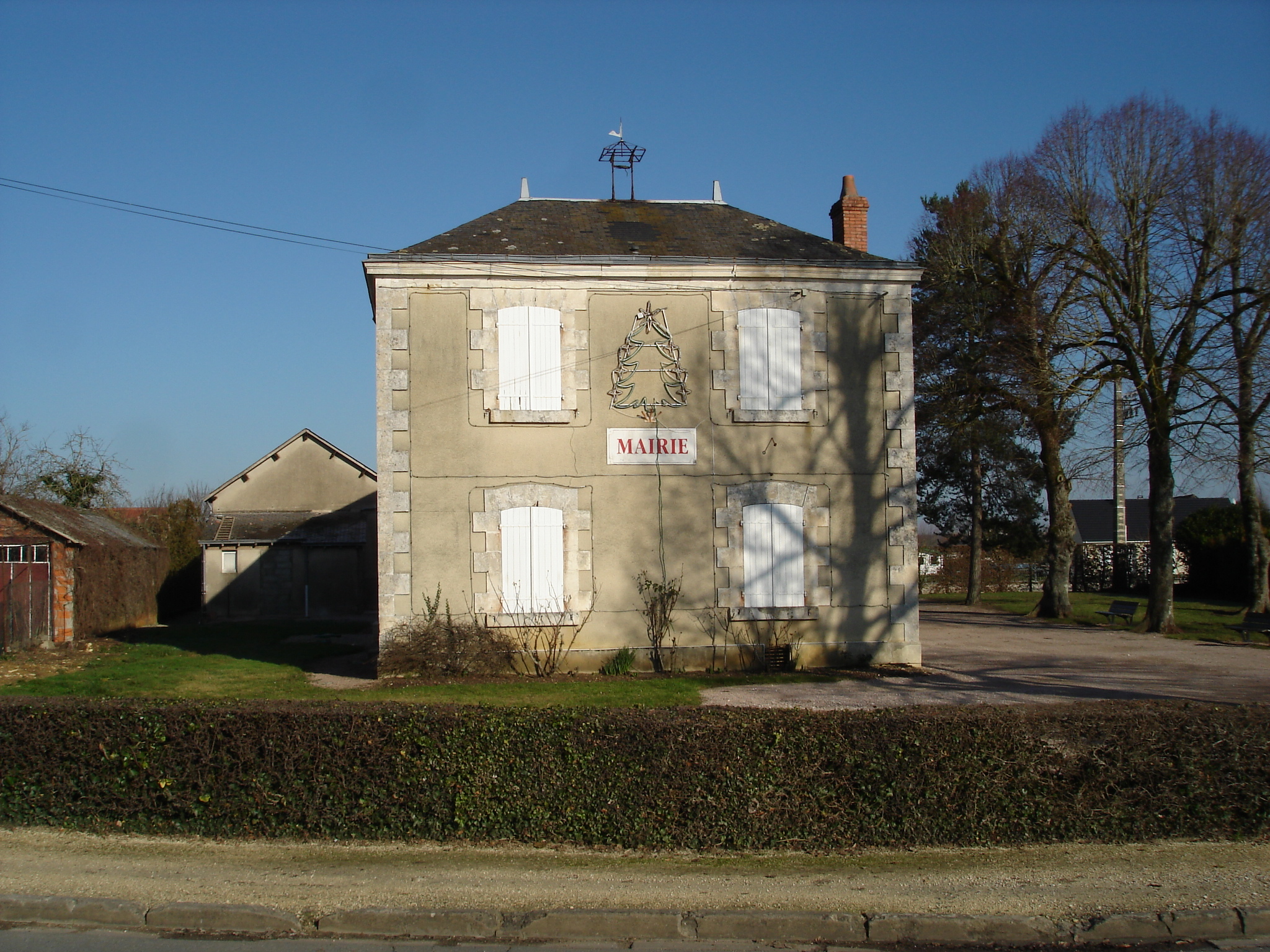
- The town hall in Mâron
- Location of Mâron
- Location within France Location within Centre-Val de Loire
- Coordinates: 46°48′28″N 1°51′59″E
- Country: France
- Region: Centre-Val de Loire
- Department: Indre
- Arrondissement: Châteauroux
- Canton: Ardentes
- Intercommunality: CA Châteauroux Métropole

Government
  - Mayor (2020–2026): Gilbert Blanc
- Area^{1}: 27.84 km^{2} (10.75 sq mi)
- Elevation: 160 m (520 ft)
- Highest elevation: 171 m (561 ft)
- Lowest elevation: 147 m (482 ft)
- Population (2023): 735
  - Density: 26.4/km^{2} (68.4/sq mi)
- Time zone: UTC+01:00 (CET)
  - Summer (DST): UTC+02:00 (CEST)
- INSEE/Postal code: 36112 /36120
- ^{1} French Land Register data, which excludes lakes, ponds, glaciers > 1 km^{2} (0.386 sq mi or 247 acres) and river estuaries.

Mâron (French pronunciation: [maʁɔ̃]) is a commune in the Indre department in central France.

== Population ==
Historical population
Year	Pop.	±% p.a.
1968	566	—
1975	509	−1.50%
1982	575	+1.76%
1990	665	+1.83%
1999	679	+0.23%
2007	725	+0.82%
2012	755	+0.81%
2017	762	+0.18%
2023	735	−0.60%
Source: INSEE

== See also ==
- Communes of the Indre department
