= Le Poinçonnet =

- Commune
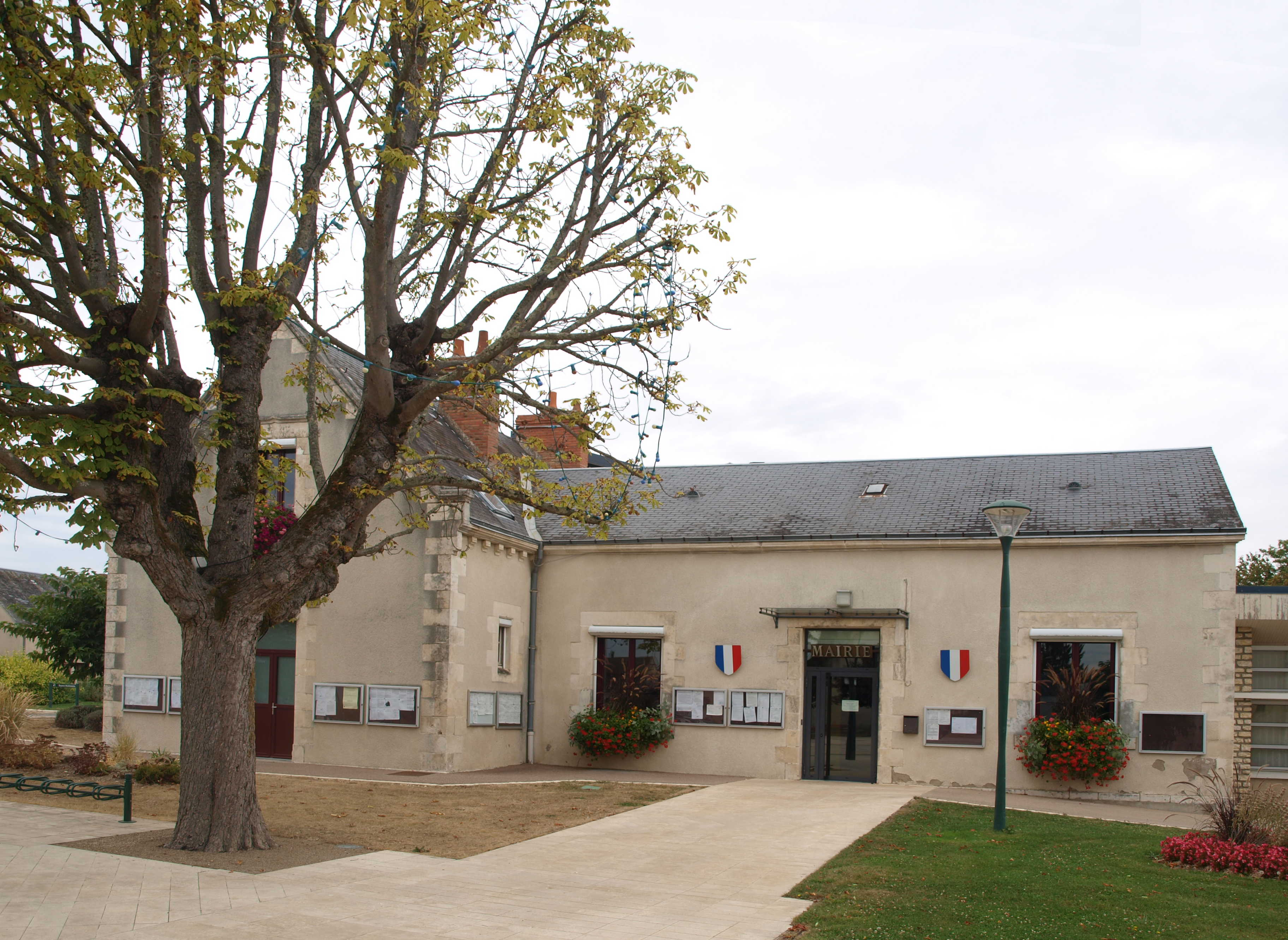
- Town hall
- Location of Le Poinçonnet
- Location within France Location within Centre-Val de Loire
- Coordinates: 46°45′52″N 1°43′11″E
- Country: France
- Region: Centre-Val de Loire
- Department: Indre
- Arrondissement: Châteauroux
- Canton: Ardentes
- Intercommunality: CA Châteauroux Métropole

Government
  - Mayor (2020–2026): Danielle Dupré-Ségot
- Area^{1}: 45 km^{2} (17 sq mi)
- Elevation: 159 m (522 ft)
- Highest elevation: 186 m (610 ft)
- Lowest elevation: 145 m (476 ft)
- Population (2023): 5,855
  - Density: 130/km^{2} (340/sq mi)
- Time zone: UTC+01:00 (CET)
  - Summer (DST): UTC+02:00 (CEST)
- INSEE/Postal code: 36159 /36330
- ^{1} French Land Register data, which excludes lakes, ponds, glaciers > 1 km^{2} (0.386 sq mi or 247 acres) and river estuaries.

Le Poinçonnet (French pronunciation: [lə pwɛ̃sɔnɛ]) is a commune in the Indre department in central France.

== Population ==
Historical population

Year	Pop.	±% p.a.
1793	766	—
1800	844	+1.39%
1806	930	+1.63%
1821	1,036	+0.72%
1831	962	−0.74%
1836	1,029	+1.36%
1841	1,036	+0.14%
1846	1,163	+2.34%
1851	1,178	+0.26%
1856	1,154	−0.41%
1861	1,059	−1.70%
1866	1,111	+0.96%
1872	1,125	+0.21%
1876	1,206	+1.75%
1881	1,180	−0.43%
1886	1,169	−0.19%
1891	1,188	+0.32%
1896	1,132	−0.96%
1901	1,159	+0.47%

Year	Pop.	±% p.a.
1906	1,226	+1.13%
1911	1,104	−2.07%
1921	1,027	−0.72%
1926	1,047	+0.39%
1931	1,001	−0.89%
1936	1,013	+0.24%
1946	1,285	+2.41%
1954	1,402	+1.10%
1962	1,457	+0.48%
1968	1,551	+1.05%
1975	2,347	+6.10%
1982	3,766	+6.99%
1990	4,600	+2.53%
1999	5,021	+0.98%
2007	5,690	+1.58%
2012	5,813	+0.43%
2017	5,851	+0.13%
2023	5,855	+0.01%

Source: EHESS and INSEE (1968-2023)

== See also ==
- Communes of the Indre department
