= Indre's 2nd constituency =

Constituency of the National Assembly of France

2nd constituency of Indre
- inline Constituency of the National Assembly of France

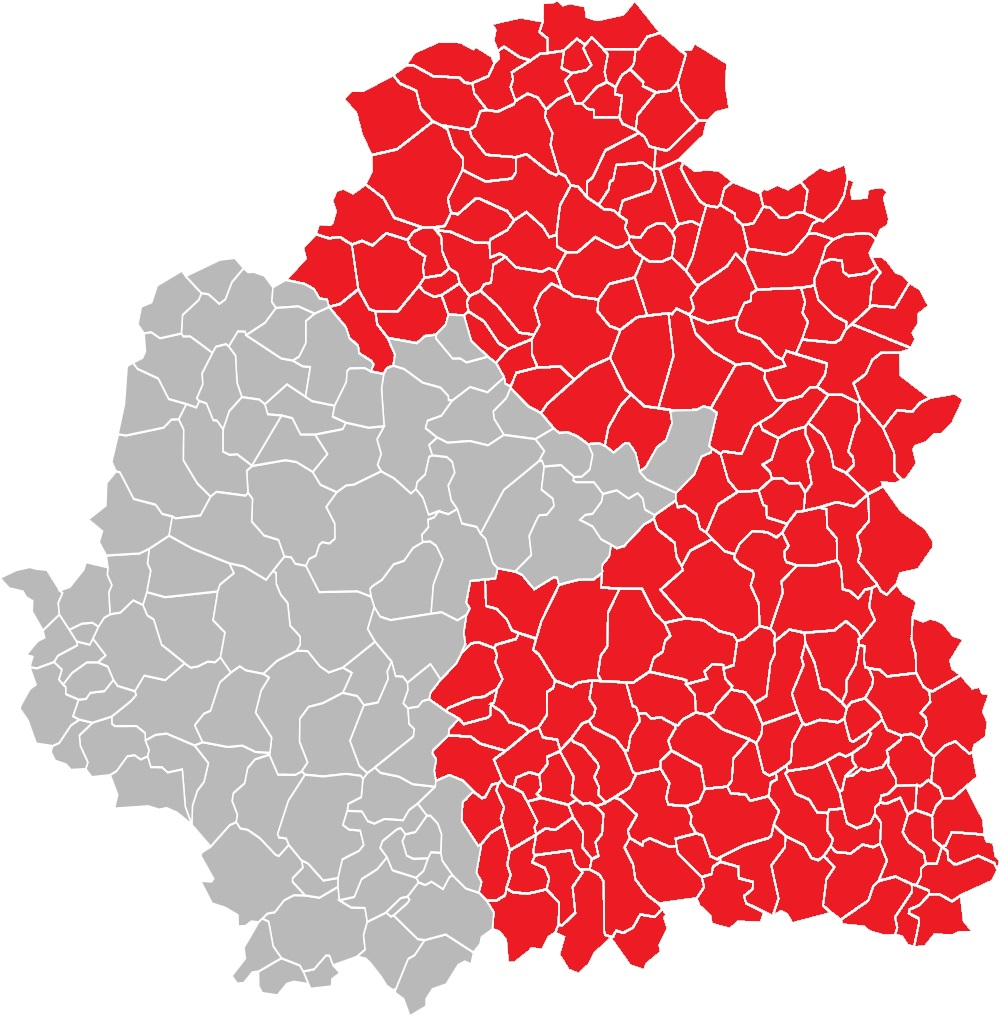
- 2nd Constituency (after 2012) in Indre

- Location of Indre in France
- Deputy: Nicolas Forissier; LR
- Department: Indre
- Cantons: Ardentes (11/12 communes), Argenton-sur-Creuse, La Châtre, Issoudun, Levroux, Neuvy-Saint-Sépulchre, Valençay and Saint-Gaultier (2/34 communes)

The 2nd constituency of Indre is a French legislative constituency in the Indre département.

From 1958 to 2012, it was one of three constituencies in Indre. In the 2010 redistricting, the number of constituencies in Indre was reduced to two. It consists of the following cantons (partial cantons noted in brackets) Ardentes (11/12 communes), Argenton-sur-Creuse, La Châtre, Issoudun, Levroux, Neuvy-Saint-Sépulchre, Valençay and Saint-Gaultier (2/34 communes).

== Deputies ==
Election	Member	Party
1988	Jean-Claude Blin	PS
1993	Nicolas Forissier	UDF
1997	Nicolas Forissier	UDF
2002	Nicolas Forissier	UMP
2007	Nicolas Forissier	UMP
2012	Isabelle Bruneau	PS
2017	Nicolas Forissier	LR
2022	Nicolas Forissier	LR
2024	Nicolas Forissier	LR

== Election results ==
=== 2024 ===
Candidate	Party	Alliance	First round			Second round		
Candidate	Party	Alliance	Votes	%	+/–	Votes	%	+/–
Marc Siffert	LR-RN	UXD	24,512	41.71	new	27,242	47.24	new
Nicolas Forissier	LR	UDC	18,700	31.82	+6.30	30,423	52.76	-5.43
Clément Sapin	PS	NFP	13,783	23.46	+1.46	withdrew		
Damien Mercier	LO		931	1.58	-0.38			
Pierre Schwarz	DIV		836	1.42	new			
Votes			58,762	100.00		57,665	100.00	
Valid votes			58,762	96.37	-0.51	57,665	94.27	+4.74
Blank votes			1,400	2.30	+0.15	2,325	3.80	-3.66
Null votes			814	1.33	+0.35	1,179	1.93	-1.07
Turnout			60,976	69.79	+17.67	61,169	70.01	+21.12
Abstentions			26,395	30.21	-17.67	26,202	29.99	-21.12
Registered voters			87,371			87,371		
Result			LR HOLD					

=== 2022 ===
Legislative Election 2022: Indre's 2nd constituency
Party	Candidate	Votes	%	±%
LR (UDC)	Nicolas Forissier	11,386	25.52	+1.13
RN	Fabien Thirion	10,545	23.64	+8.63
LFI (NUPÉS)	Aymeric Compain	9,815	22.00	−5.86
MoDem (Ensemble)	Sophie Guerin	8,192	18.36	−10.24
REC	Jean Michel Péroux	1,593	3.57	N/A
LMR	Alexandra Botton	1,000	2.24	N/A
Others	N/A	2,081	-	−
Turnout		44,612	52.12	−1.44
2nd round result
LR (UDC)	Nicolas Forissier	22,507	58.19	+6.50
RN	Fabien Thirion	16,174	41.81	N/A
Turnout		38,361	48.89	+0.59
LR hold				

=== 2017 ===
Candidate	Label	First round		Second round	
Candidate	Label	Votes	%	Votes	%
Sophie Guérin	MoDem	13,405	28.60	17,962	48.31
Nicolas Forissier	LR	11,432	24.39	19,218	51.69
Dominique Lanyi	FN	7,035	15.01		
Isabelle Bruneau	PS	5,942	12.68		
Lionel Thura	FI	5,140	10.97		
Raphaël Tillié	ECO	1,218	2.60		
Yann Dubois de La Sablonière	DVD	946	2.02		
Michel Sallandre	PCF	754	1.61		
Damien Mercier	EXG	366	0.78		
Laëtitia Dallais	DIV	256	0.55		
Aline Pornet	EXG	231	0.49		
Pierre Schwarz	DIV	145	0.31		
Votes		46,870	100.00	37,180	100.00
Valid votes		46,870	97.17	37,180	85.48
Blank votes		947	1.96	4,360	10.02
Null votes		417	0.86	1,958	4.50
Turnout		48,234	53.56	43,498	48.30
Abstentions		41,818	46.44	46,554	51.70
Registered voters		90,052		90,052	
Source: Ministry of the Interior

=== 2012 ===
2012 legislative election in Indre's 2nd constituency
Candidate	Party	First round		Second round	
Candidate	Party	Votes	%	Votes	%
Isabelle Bruneau	PS	22,299	40.12%	31,366	55.18%
Nicolas Forissier	UMP	19,153	34.46%	25,474	44.82%
Matthieu Colombier	FN	6,765	12.17%		
Jacques Pallas	FG	3,238	5.83%		
Raphaël Tillie	EELV	1,231	2.21%		
Dorian Da Silva	MoDem	901	1.62%		
Hugues Foucault	PCD	591	1.06%		
Didier Vaidis	DLR	458	0.82%		
Catherine Moreau	LO	387	0.70%		
Norbert Potier	Communistes	319	0.57%		
Thierry Rouhart	NPA	237	0.43%		
Valid votes		55,579	97.72%	56,840	96.40%
Spoilt and null votes		1,294	2.28%	2,125	3.60%
Votes cast / turnout		56,873	62.14%	58,965	64.42%
Abstentions		34,655	37.86%	32,561	35.58%
Registered voters		91,528	100.00%	91,526	100.00%

=== 2007 ===
Legislative Election 2007: Indre's 2nd constituency
Party	Candidate	Votes	%	±%
UMP	Nicolas Forissier	18,497	46.73	−0.03
DVG	Marie-Françoise Bechtel	8,405	21.24	N/A
MoDem	Vanik Berberian	3,069	7.75	N/A
PCF	Jacques Pallas	2,346	5.93	+2.14
FN	Ludovic de Danne	1,642	4.15	−3.90
LCR	Mathieu Michel	1,218	3.08	N/A
LV	Jocelyne Giraud	1,109	2.80	−0.06
Others	N/A	3,293	-	−
Turnout		41,528	64.21	−5.95
2nd round result
UMP	Nicolas Forissier	21,481	54.15	−3.09
DVG	Marie-Françoise Bechtel	18,186	45.85	N/A
Turnout		41,528	64.21	−3.79
UMP hold				

=== 2002 ===
Legislative Election 2002: Indre's 2nd constituency
Party	Candidate	Votes	%	±%
UMP	Nicolas Forissier	20,595	46.76	N/A
PS	André Laignel	15,012	34.08	+0.39
FN	Charlotte d'Ogny	3,544	8.05	−2.76
PCF	Michel Fradet	1,669	3.79	−6.31
LV	Jocelyne Giraud	1,260	2.86	−2.81
CPNT	Philippe Caffin	898	2.04	N/A
LO	Jean-Marie Sornin	737	1.67	N/A
MNR	Odile Gallot	331	0.75	N/A
Turnout		45,102	70.16	−2.32
2nd round result
UMP	Nicolas Forissier	24,096	57.24	N/A
PS	André Laignel	18,004	42.76	−6.81
Turnout		43,710	68.00	−9.78
UMP gain from PR				

=== 1997 ===
Legislative Election 1997: Indre's 2nd constituency
Party	Candidate	Votes	%	±%
PR (UDF)	Nicolas Forissier	16,747	38.24	
PS	André Laignel	14,754	33.69	
FN	Stéphane Tarditi	4,734	10.81	
PCF	Bruno Martin	4,421	10.10	
LV	François Nemo	2,482	5.67	
DIV	Gérard Filliette	653	1.49	
Turnout		46,529	72.48	
2nd round result
PR (UDF)	Nicolas Forissier	23,787	50.43	
PS	André Laignel	23,379	49.57	
Turnout		49,924	77.78	
PR hold				
