= Canton of Châteauroux-2 =

Canton of France

Coordinates: 46.80°N 1.71°E

Châteauroux-2
- Canton
- Interactive map of Châteauroux-2
- Country: France
- Region: Centre-Val de Loire
- Department: Indre
- No. of communes: {{{nbcomm}}}
- Established: 22 March 2015

Government
  - Representatives (2021–2028): Jean-Yves Hugon; Imane Jbara-Sounni
- INSEE code: 36 06

The canton of Châteauroux-2 is an administrative division of the Indre department, central France. It was created at the French canton reorganisation which came into effect in March 2015. Its seat is in Châteauroux.

It consists of the following communes:

1. Châteauroux (partly)

== Representation ==
List of successive departmental councillors for the Canton of Châteauroux-2
Electoral term		Mandate		Name	Party	Capacity	Ref.
2015	2021	2015	2021	Jean-Yves Hugon	LR	Former Deputy for Indre Deputy Mayor of Châteauroux	
2015	2021	2015	2021	Imane Jbara-Sounni	DVD	Deputy Mayor of Châteauroux	
2021	2028	2021	2026	Jean-Yves Hugon	LR	councillor (died in office)	
2021	2028	2026	Incumbent	Stéphane Zecchi		Incumbent councillor	
2021	2028	2021	Incumbent	Imane Jbara-Sounni	DVD	Incumbent councillor	
