= François Jolivet =

French politician

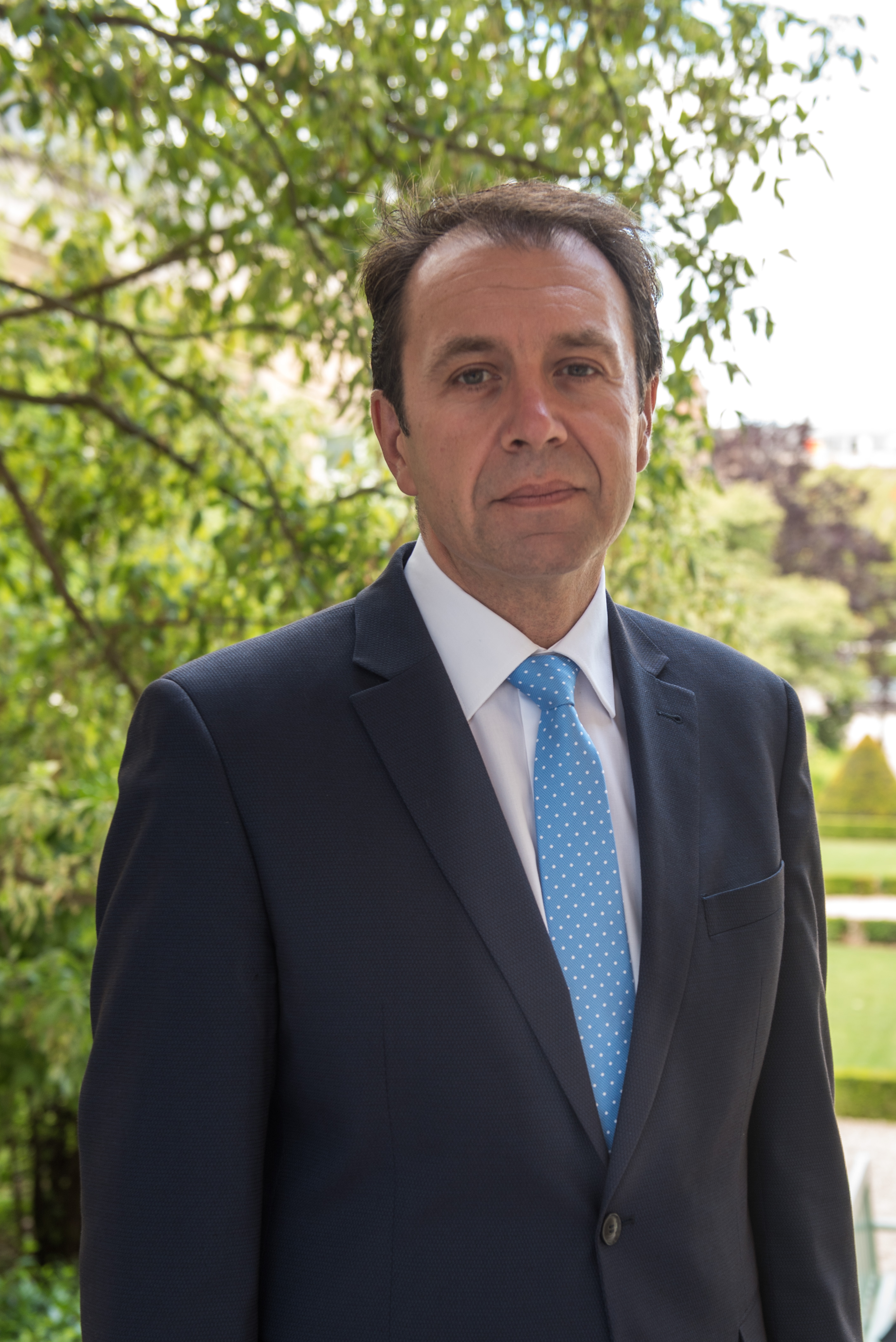

Member of the National Assembly for Indre's 1st constituency
- Incumbent
- Assumed office 21 June 2017
- Preceded by: Jean-Paul Chanteguet

Personal details
- Born: 21 March 1966 (age 60) Lormes, France
- Party: La République En Marche!
- Education: University of Poitiers

François Jolivet (born 21 March 1966) is a French politician of La République En Marche! (LREM) who was elected to the French National Assembly on 18 June 2017, representing the department of Indre.

== Political career ==
From 1995 to his election as parliamentarian in 2017, Jolivet was the mayor Saint-Maur as a member of the Union for a Popular Movement and then the Miscellaneous right.

In parliament, Jolivet serves on the Finance Committee. In addition to his committee assignments, he is a member of the French-Russian Parliamentary Friendship Group and of the French delegation to the Parliamentary Assembly of the Organization for Security and Co-operation in Europe (OSCE).

== Political positions ==
In July 2019, Jolivet decided not to align with his parliamentary group's majority and became one of 52 LREM members who abstained from a vote on the French ratification of the European Union’s Comprehensive Economic and Trade Agreement (CETA) with Canada.

In early 2019, together with around twenty other LREM members, Jolivet proposed to re-establish a solidarity tax on wealth, which had been abolished the previous year.

In 2021, Jolivet sponsored legislation aimed at prohibiting the use of gender-neutral language in government publications, arguing that it "blurs the message and complicates the learning of the French language."

In February 2022, Jolivet went against the party line again and was one of six LREM legislators who supported the Republicans’ motion for a ban on wearing hijabs in sports competitions.
