= Le Blanc =

- Subprefecture and commune
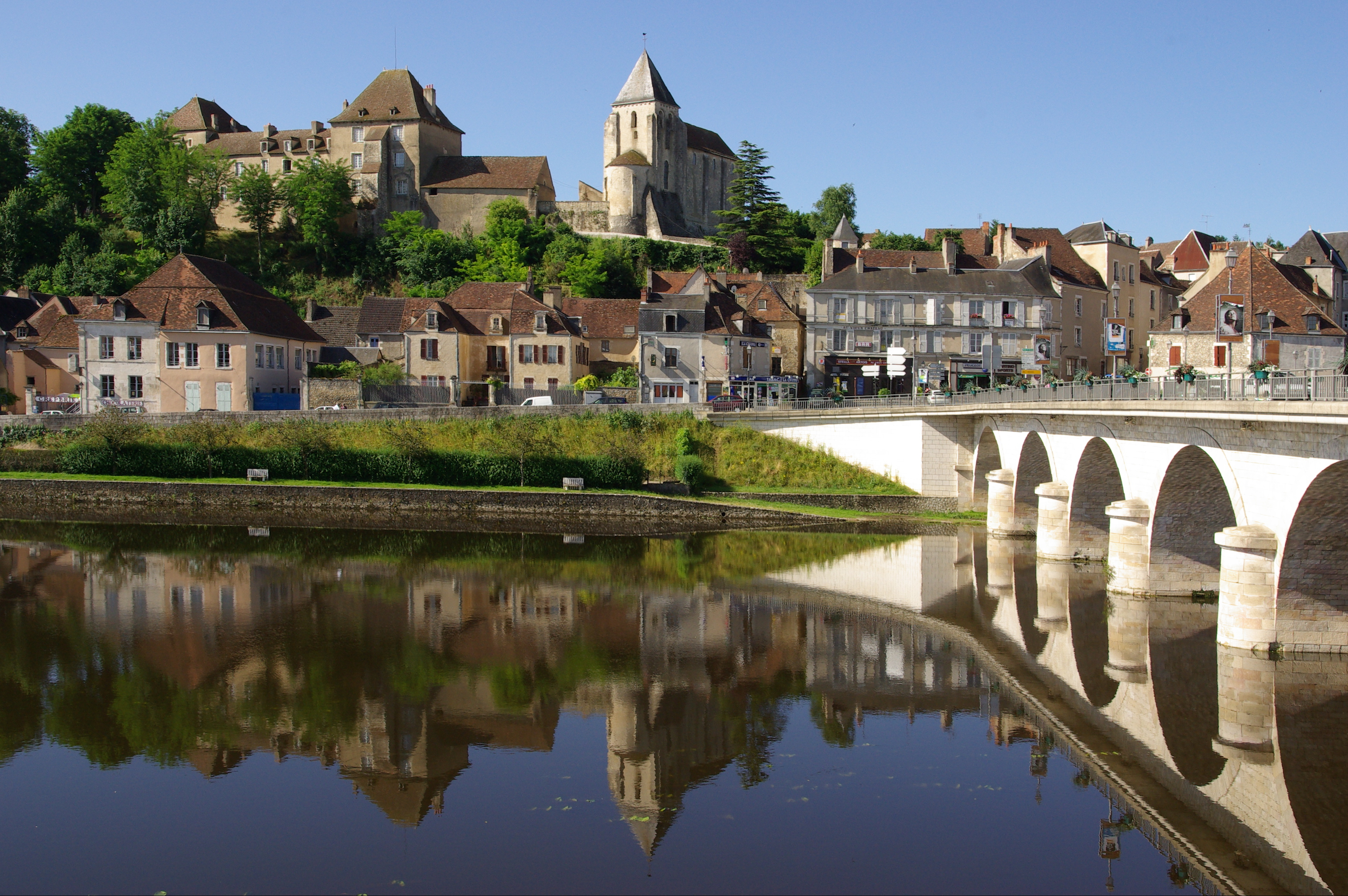
- Château de Naillac

- Coat of arms
- Location of Le Blanc
- Location within France Location within Centre-Val de Loire
- Coordinates: 46°38′04″N 1°03′49″E
- Country: France
- Region: Centre-Val de Loire
- Department: Indre
- Arrondissement: Le Blanc
- Canton: Le Blanc

Government
  - Mayor (2020–2026): Gilles Lherpiniere
- Area^{1}: 57.61 km^{2} (22.24 sq mi)
- Elevation: 120 m (390 ft)
- Highest elevation: 140 m (460 ft)
- Lowest elevation: 72 m (236 ft)
- Population (2023): 6,164
  - Density: 107.0/km^{2} (277.1/sq mi)
- Demonym: Blancois.e
- Time zone: UTC+01:00 (CET)
  - Summer (DST): UTC+02:00 (CEST)
- INSEE/Postal code: 36018 /36300
- ^{1} French Land Register data, which excludes lakes, ponds, glaciers > 1 km^{2} (0.386 sq mi or 247 acres) and river estuaries.

Le Blanc (French pronunciation: [lə blɑ̃]; Occitan: Lo Blanc; Latin: Oblincum Cuborum) is a commune and a subprefecture of the department of Indre, and the region of Centre-Val de Loire, central France.

== Geography ==
Le Blanc is the main city of the Parc naturel régional de la Brenne, on the banks of the river Creuse.

== History ==
Le Blanc, which is identified with the Roman Oblincum, was in the Middle Ages a lordship belonging to the house of Naillac and a frontier fortress of the province of Berry.

== Population ==
Historical population

Year	Pop.	±% p.a.
1793	4,780	—
1800	4,723	−0.17%
1806	3,662	−4.15%
1821	4,452	+1.31%
1831	4,804	+0.76%
1836	5,095	+1.18%
1841	5,290	+0.75%
1846	6,075	+2.81%
1851	6,788	+2.24%
1856	5,731	−3.33%
1861	5,882	+0.52%
1866	5,956	+0.25%
1872	5,709	−0.70%
1876	6,122	+1.76%
1881	6,558	+1.39%
1886	7,140	+1.72%
1891	7,389	+0.69%
1896	6,764	−1.75%
1901	6,663	−0.30%

Year	Pop.	±% p.a.
1906	6,520	−0.43%
1911	6,493	−0.08%
1921	5,284	−2.04%
1926	5,511	+0.84%
1931	5,426	−0.31%
1936	5,789	+1.30%
1946	6,719	+1.50%
1954	6,427	−0.55%
1962	6,402	−0.05%
1968	6,767	+0.93%
1975	8,024	+2.46%
1982	7,769	−0.46%
1990	7,361	−0.67%
1999	6,998	−0.56%
2007	6,926	−0.13%
2012	6,840	−0.25%
2017	6,389	−1.35%
2023	6,164	−0.60%

Source: EHESS and INSEE (1968–2023)

== Buildings ==
The church of St Génitour dates from the 12th, 13th and 15th centuries. There is an old castle restored in the 19th century.

== Facilities ==
Near Le Blanc, there is a VLF-transmitter of French Navy. It transmits messages on 18.3 kHz and 21.7 kHz to submerged submarines

== Climate ==
Climate data for Le Blanc (1991–2020 normals, extremes 1947–present)
Month	Jan	Feb	Mar	Apr	May	Jun	Jul	Aug	Sep	Oct	Nov	Dec	Year
Record high °C (°F)	19.0 (66.2)	24.8 (76.6)	27.8 (82.0)	32.0 (89.6)	34.6 (94.3)	44.3 (111.7)	43.3 (109.9)	43.7 (110.7)	38.9 (102.0)	33.1 (91.6)	24.8 (76.6)	21.0 (69.8)	44.3 (111.7)
Mean daily maximum °C (°F)	8.6 (47.5)	10.1 (50.2)	14.2 (57.6)	17.5 (63.5)	21.3 (70.3)	25.2 (77.4)	27.7 (81.9)	27.6 (81.7)	23.4 (74.1)	18.2 (64.8)	12.4 (54.3)	9.0 (48.2)	17.9 (64.2)
Daily mean °C (°F)	5.5 (41.9)	6.0 (42.8)	9.2 (48.6)	11.8 (53.2)	15.5 (59.9)	19.1 (66.4)	21.2 (70.2)	21.1 (70.0)	17.3 (63.1)	13.6 (56.5)	8.8 (47.8)	5.9 (42.6)	12.9 (55.2)
Mean daily minimum °C (°F)	2.5 (36.5)	2.0 (35.6)	4.1 (39.4)	6.1 (43.0)	9.6 (49.3)	13.1 (55.6)	14.7 (58.5)	14.5 (58.1)	11.2 (52.2)	9.0 (48.2)	5.2 (41.4)	2.9 (37.2)	7.9 (46.2)
Record low °C (°F)	−18.4 (−1.1)	−18.0 (−0.4)	−10.5 (13.1)	−5.2 (22.6)	−1.2 (29.8)	3.0 (37.4)	3.8 (38.8)	3.8 (38.8)	0.8 (33.4)	−5.8 (21.6)	−9.1 (15.6)	−13.0 (8.6)	−18.4 (−1.1)
Average precipitation mm (inches)	68.3 (2.69)	53.8 (2.12)	56.0 (2.20)	60.8 (2.39)	74.7 (2.94)	61.6 (2.43)	51.3 (2.02)	54.3 (2.14)	57.8 (2.28)	78.1 (3.07)	79.2 (3.12)	80.5 (3.17)	776.4 (30.57)
Average precipitation days (≥ 1.0 mm)	12.4	10.5	9.9	10.2	10.4	8.3	7.6	7.2	7.8	11.0	12.3	12.6	120.1
Source: Meteocielall-time extreme temperature

== See also ==
- Saint-Benoît-du-Sault
- Communes of the Indre department
- Marcel Gaumont. Sculptor of war memorial
