= Nicolas Forissier =

French politician (born 1961)

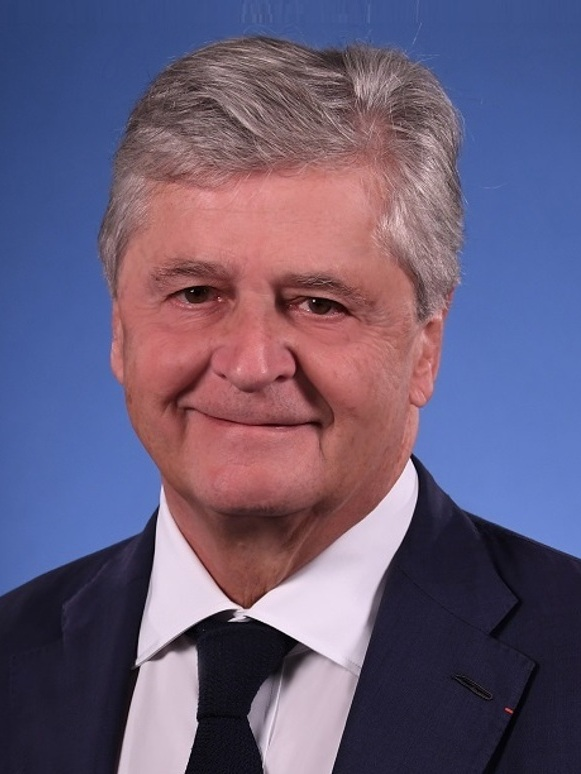
- Forissier in 2025

Minister Delegate for Foreign Trade and Attractiveness
- Incumbent
- Assumed office 12 October 2025
- Prime Minister: Sébastien Lecornu
- Preceded by: Laurent Saint-Martin

Member of the National Assembly for Indre's 2nd constituency
- Incumbent
- Assumed office 21 June 2017
- Preceded by: Isabelle Bruneau
- In office 20 June 2007 – 19 June 2012
- Preceded by: Bernard Pousset
- Succeeded by: Isabelle Bruneau
- In office 2 April 1993 – 30 April 2004
- Preceded by: Jean-Claude Blin
- Succeeded by: Bernard Pousset

Secretary of State for Agriculture, Food, Fisheries and Rural Affairs
- In office 31 March 2004 – 31 May 2005
- Prime Minister: Jean-Pierre Raffarin
- Preceded by: Raymond-Max Aubert (Rural Development, 1995)
- Succeeded by: Guillaume Garot (Minister Delegate for Agrifood, 2012)

Member of the Regional Council of Centre-Val de Loire
- Incumbent
- Assumed office 18 December 2015

Mayor of La Châtre
- In office 25 June 1995 – 11 July 2017
- Preceded by: Maurice Tissandier
- Succeeded by: Patrick Judalet

Personal details
- Born: 17 February 1961 (age 65) Paris, France
- Party: Republican Party (1986–1997); Liberal Democracy (1997–2002); Union for a Popular Movement (2002–2015); The Republicans (2015–present)
- Education: Paris-Sorbonne University; Sciences Po

Nicolas Forissier (French pronunciation: [nikɔla fɔʁisje]; born 17 February 1961) is a French politician who has represented the 2nd constituency of the Indre department in the National Assembly since 2017, previously holding the seat twice, from 1993 to 2004 and again from 2007 until his defeat in 2012. A member of The Republicans (LR), he was appointed Secretary of State for Agriculture, Food, Fisheries and Rural Affairs in 2004, a position he retained until 2005.

== Career ==
Forissier started his political career as a Deputy Mayor of La Châtre in 1989, before his election to the mayorship in 1995, an office he would retain until 2017. From 2002 to 2017, he also presided over the communauté de communes de La Châtre et Sainte-Sévère. In 2017, he was appointed honorary mayor by the prefect of Indre.

In the 1993 legislative election, Forissier was elected to the National Assembly in the 2nd constituency of Indre. He was reelected in 1997, 2002, 2007, 2017, 2022 and 2024. In Parliament, he has served on the Production Committee (1993–2002), Finance Committee (2002–2004, 2007–2012, 2017–2020) and Foreign Affairs Committee (2020–present). In addition to his committee assignments, he has presided over the French-Argentinian Parliamentary Friendship Group since 2017, a position he previously held twice (2002–2004, 2007–2009). He also presided over the French-Mauritanian Parliamentary Friendship Group (1997–2002) and French-Indian Parliamentary Friendship Group (2009–2012).

From 2004 to 2005, Forissier served as Secretary of State for Agriculture, Food, Fisheries and Rural Affairs under successive Agriculture Ministers Hervé Gaymard and Dominique Bussereau in the third government of Prime Minister Jean-Pierre Raffarin.

In 2015, Forissier was elected to the Regional Council of Centre-Val de Loire. In 2021, he led a joint ticket between The Republicans, the Union of Democrats and Independents, the Rurality Movement, The Centrists and Soyons libres, but placed second behind incumbent Regional Council President François Bonneau of the Socialist Party.

== Political positions ==
In The Republicans' 2017 leadership election, Forissier endorsed Laurent Wauquiez.
