= Canton of Ardentes =

Coordinates: 46.74°N 1.83°E

The canton of Ardentes is an administrative division of the Indre department, central France. Its borders were modified at the French canton reorganisation which came into effect in March 2015. Its seat is in Ardentes.

It consists of the following communes:

1. Ambrault
2. Ardentes
3. Arthon
4. Diors
5. Étrechet
6. Jeu-les-Bois
7. Mâron
8. Montierchaume
9. Le Poinçonnet
10. Sainte-Fauste
11. Sassierges-Saint-Germain
12. Vouillon
