= Canton of Châteauroux-1 =

French administrative division

Coordinates: 46.81°N 1.70°E

The canton of Châteauroux-1 is an administrative division of the Indre department, central France. It was created at the French canton reorganisation which came into effect in March 2015. Its seat is in Châteauroux.

It consists of the following communes:

1. Châteauroux (partly)
2. Déols
