= Indre =

Department of France

- Department
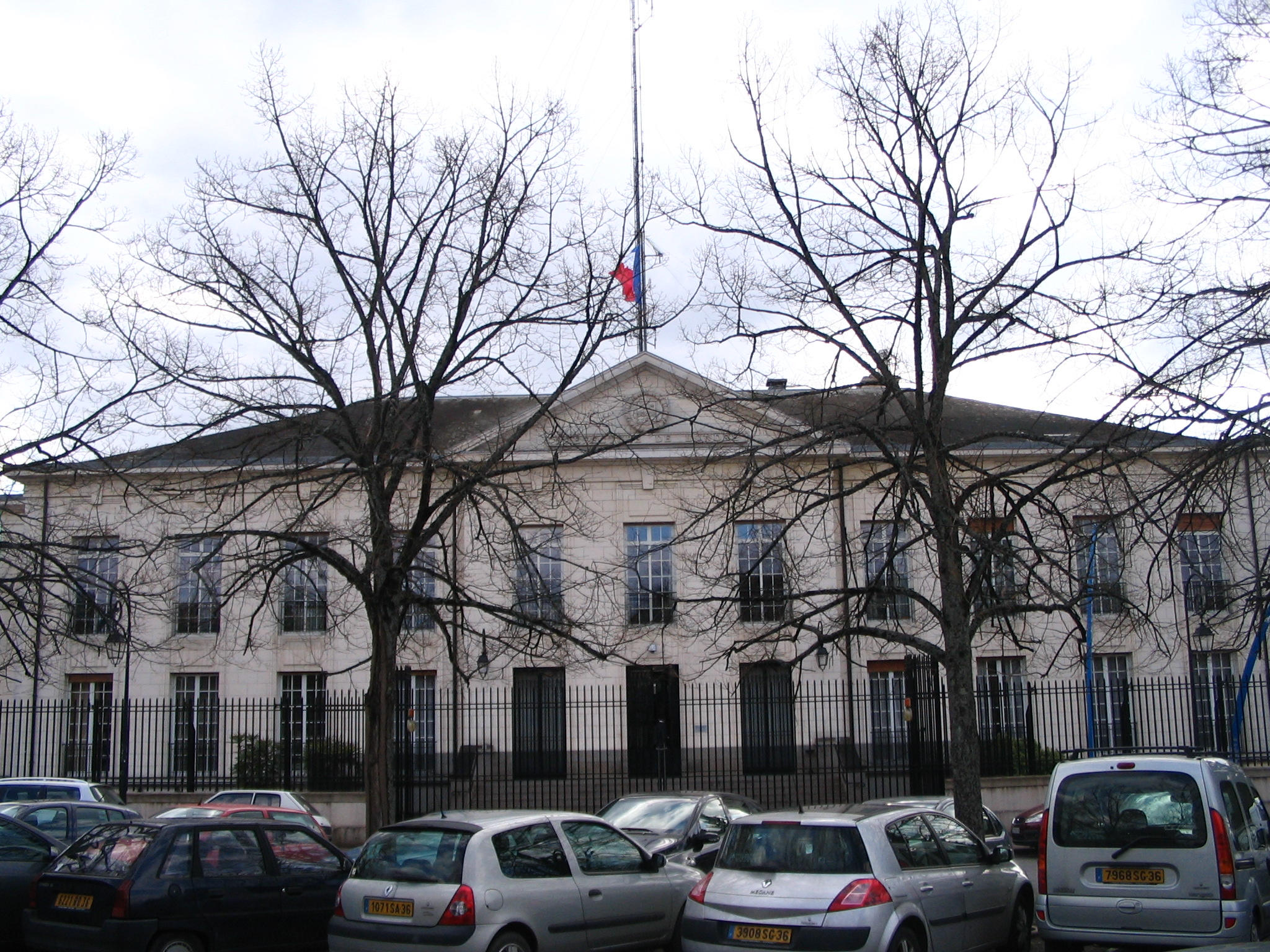
- Prefecture building of the Indre department, in Châteauroux

- Flag Coat of arms

- Location of Indre in France
- Coordinates: 46°46′N 1°36′E
- Country: France
- Region: Centre-Val de Loire
- Prefecture: Châteauroux
- Subprefectures: Le Blanc; La Châtre; Issoudun

Government
  - President of the Departmental Council: Marc Fleuret (UDI)

Area^{1}
  - Total: 6,791 km^{2} (2,622 sq mi)

Population (2023)
  - Total: 216,069
  - Rank: 88th
  - Density: 31.82/km^{2} (82.41/sq mi)
- Time zone: UTC+1 (CET)
  - Summer (DST): UTC+2 (CEST)
- Department number: 36
- Arrondissements: 4
- Cantons: 13
- Communes: 241
- ^1 French Land Register data, which exclude estuaries, and lakes, ponds, and glaciers larger than 1 km^{2}

Indre (French pronunciation: [ɛ̃dʁ]), is a department in central France named after the river Indre. The inhabitants of the department are known as the Indriens (masculine; pronounced [ɛ̃dʁijɛ̃]) and Indriennes (feminine; [ɛ̃dʁijɛn]). Indre is part of the current administrative region of Centre-Val de Loire. The region is bordered by the departments of Indre-et-Loire to the west, Loir-et-Cher to the north, Cher to the east, Creuse and Haute-Vienne to the south, and Vienne to the southwest. The préfecture (capital) is Châteauroux and there are three subpréfectures at Le Blanc, La Châtre and Issoudun. It had a population of 216,069 in 2023. It contains the geographic centre of Metropolitan France.

== History ==
Indre is one of the original 83 departments created during the French Revolution on 4 March 1790, by order of the National Constituent Assembly. The new departments were to be uniformly administered and approximately equal in size and population to one another. The department was created from parts of the former provinces of Berry, Orléanais, La Marche and Touraine.

Before the Roman conquest, the Celtic Bituriges tribe occupied an area that included Indre, Cher, and part of Limousin. Their capital was Avaricum (Bourges), and another important settlement was at Argenton-sur-Creuse. The area then became part of Roman Gaul after its conquest by Julius Caesar around 58 BC, and enjoyed a period of stability. Following the collapse of the Roman Empire in the West, the Frankish tribes living in Gaul were united under the Merovingians, and succeeded in conquering most of the country in the sixth century AD. From this time, the Franks controlled most of Gaul and the Carolingian Empire was the last stage of their rule. The Carolingian dynasty reached its peak with the crowning of Charlemagne and after his death in 814, it began to fragment. The Carolingian territories were divided into three sections in 843 at the Treaty of Verdun, and the area that is now the department of Indre, became part of West Francia. In 869, the king of Middle Francia died without leaving a legitimate heir, and eventually part of that kingdom was added to West Francia to effectively form the medieval Kingdom of France.

A castle was built at Châteauroux in the late tenth century. In the eleventh century, the lords of Châteauroux were powerful in the region; their "principality" covered two thirds of the current Department of Indre and they had their own coinage.

== Geography ==
Indre is a department in central France and is part of the region of Centre-Val de Loire. The capital and largest town in the department is Châteauroux. To the north of Indre lies Loir-et-Cher, to the east Cher, to the south lies Creuse and Haute-Vienne, to the southwest lies Vienne, and to the northwest lies Indre-et-Loire. Most of the department is relatively level plains in the broad Loire Valley.

The area of the department is 5,880 km^{2} (2,270 sq mi) and it is some 100 km (62 mi) from north to south and some 90 km (56 mi) wide. The land is undulating and slopes gently towards the northwest. The main rivers are the Creuse, the Claise and the Indre. The Creuse, a tributary of the Vienne, is 264 kilometres (164 mi) long and has been impounded in several places; at the time it was built in 1926, the Eguzon Dam was the largest dam in Europe. The Claise is 88 kilometres (55 mi) long and is a tributary of the Creuse. The Indre is a longer waterway and flows centrally through the department from south to north, through the major towns of La Châtre, Châteauroux and Loches. It is a tributary of the Loire, joining it at Chinon in the neighbouring department of Loir-et-Cher.

Indre is divided into four natural regions; North Boischaut is undulating land with an altitude between 80 and 215 m (260 and 710 ft) and occupies the northeast of the department, South Boischaut is hilly and lies in the south and southeast, a marshy tract of land known as Brenne is in the southwestern part of the department, and the flat, dry, flinty limestone plateau of Champagne berrichonne is in the east and continues into Cher. The highest point of the department is near the town of Pouligny-Notre-Dame where the land rises to 459 m (1,506 ft) above sea level. The department is made up of 680,910 ha (1,682,600 acres) of land of which 401,535 ha (992,210 acres) are under arable cropping, 85,305 ha (210,790 acres) are grassland, 67,423 ha (166,610 acres) are woodland, 18,110 ha (44,800 acres) are under grapes and 18,273 ha (45,150 acres) are gardens and orchards. The remaining land is heathland, urban land and waterways.

The economy is mostly agricultural. In the past many sheep were raised in the department and woollen yarn was the main manufactured product. There is also a linen industry as well as the manufacture of hosiery and paper. The department has some minerals in the form of coal, iron, stone, marble and clay.

== Demographics ==
Historical population

Year	Pop.	±% p.a.
1791	229,768	—
1801	205,628	−1.10%
1806	204,721	−0.09%
1821	230,273	+0.79%
1831	245,289	+0.63%
1841	253,076	+0.31%
1851	271,938	+0.72%
1861	270,054	−0.07%
1872	277,693	+0.25%
1881	287,705	+0.39%
1891	292,868	+0.18%
1901	288,788	−0.14%
1911	287,673	−0.04%
1921	260,535	−0.99%

Year	Pop.	±% p.a.
1931	247,912	−0.50%
1936	245,622	−0.19%
1946	252,075	+0.26%
1954	247,436	−0.23%
1962	251,432	+0.20%
1968	247,178	−0.28%
1975	248,523	+0.08%
1982	243,191	−0.31%
1990	237,510	−0.30%
1999	231,139	−0.30%
2007	232,799	+0.09%
2012	228,692	−0.36%
2017	222,232	−0.57%
2023	216,069	−0.47%

=== Principal towns ===
The most populous commune is Châteauroux, the prefecture. As of 2023, there are 5 communes with more than 5,000 inhabitants:

Commune	Population (2023)
Châteauroux	42,963
Issoudun	11,159
Déols	7,600
Le Blanc	6,164
Le Poinçonnet	5,855

== Politics ==
The President of the Departmental Council is Marc Fleuret of the Union of Democrats and Independents.

Party		seats
•	Miscellaneous Right	9
•	Union for a Popular Movement	8
	Socialist Party	7
•	New Centre	2

=== Current National Assembly Representatives ===
Constituency	Member	Party
Indre's 1st constituency	François Jolivet	Horizons
Indre's 2nd constituency	Nicolas Forissier	The Republicans

== Tourism ==
Châteauroux, the capital of the department, is a historic town. It was originally called "Château Raoul", the present day château which now houses the préfecture being built on the site of a castle constructed in the tenth century by Raoul le Large, lord of Déols. In 1188 the castle was held by Philippe Auguste who was concerned in protecting the drapery business centred in the town and along the banks of the River Indre from fraud. From 1612 to 1736 it was a duchy of the House of Condé and from 1742 to 1744 was under the control of the Marquise de la Tournelle. The Indre department has two villages which have been classified among the most beautiful villages of France: Saint-Benoît-du-Sault and Gargilesse-Dampierre.

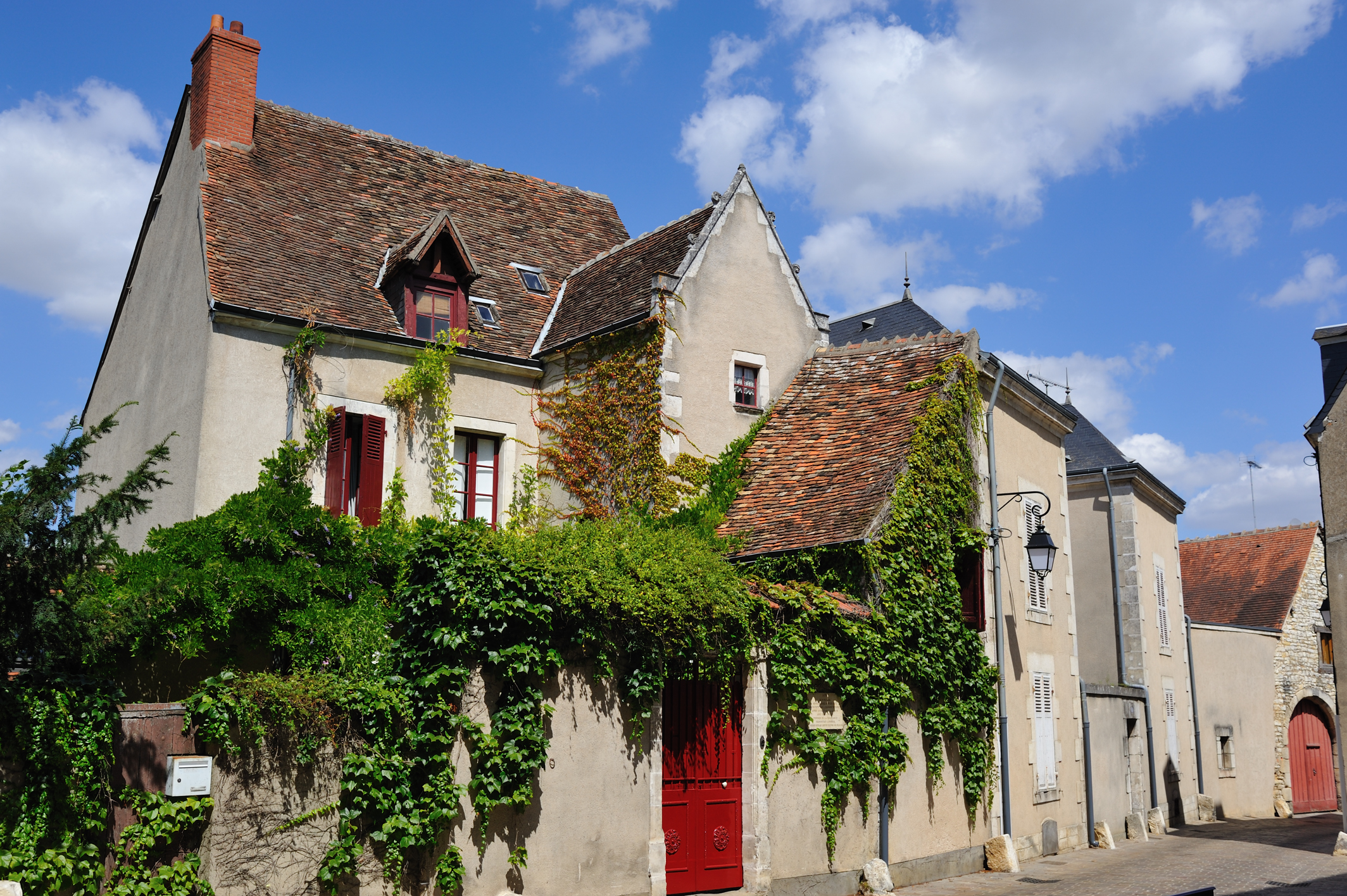
Châteauroux

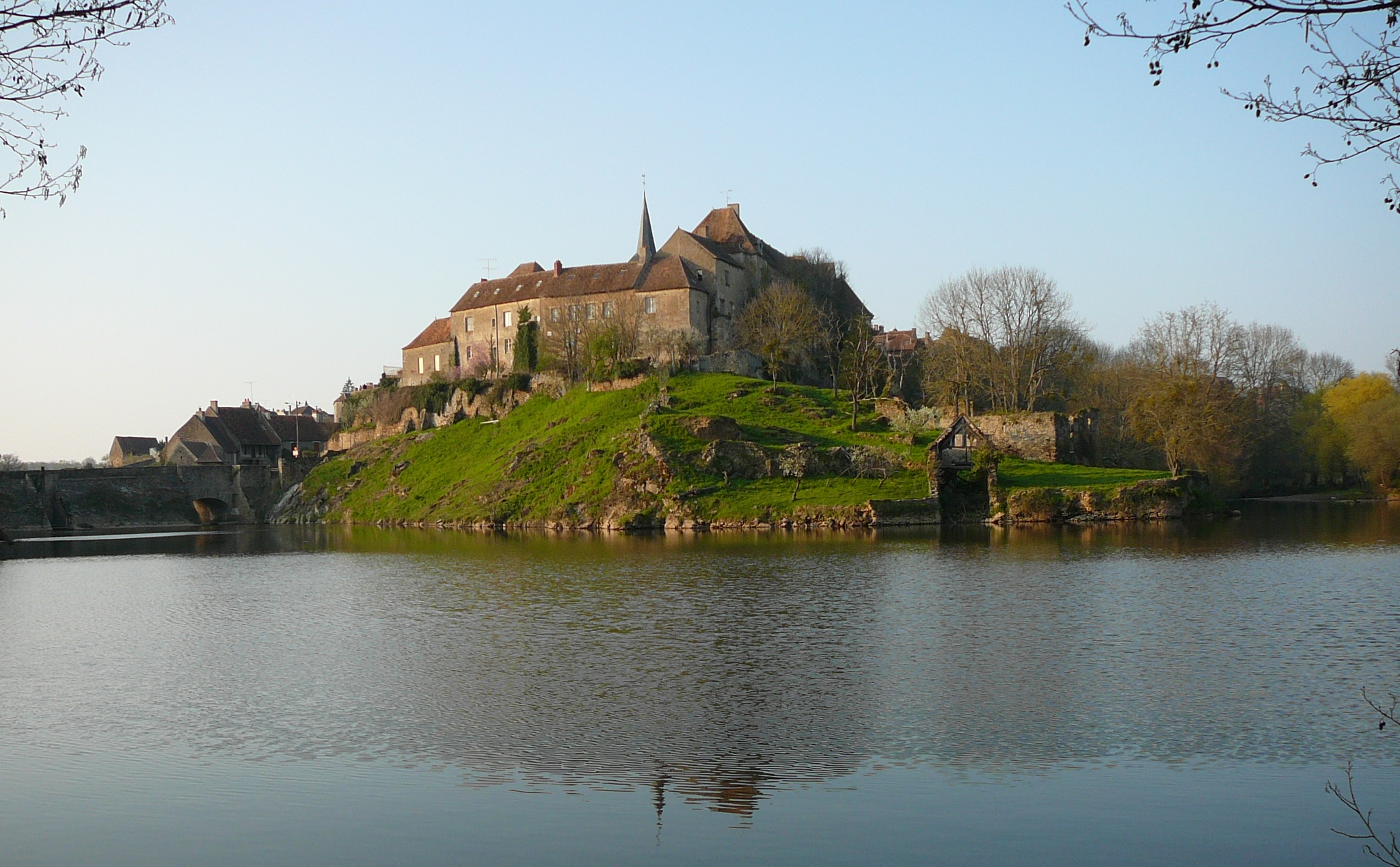
Saint-Benoît-du-Sault

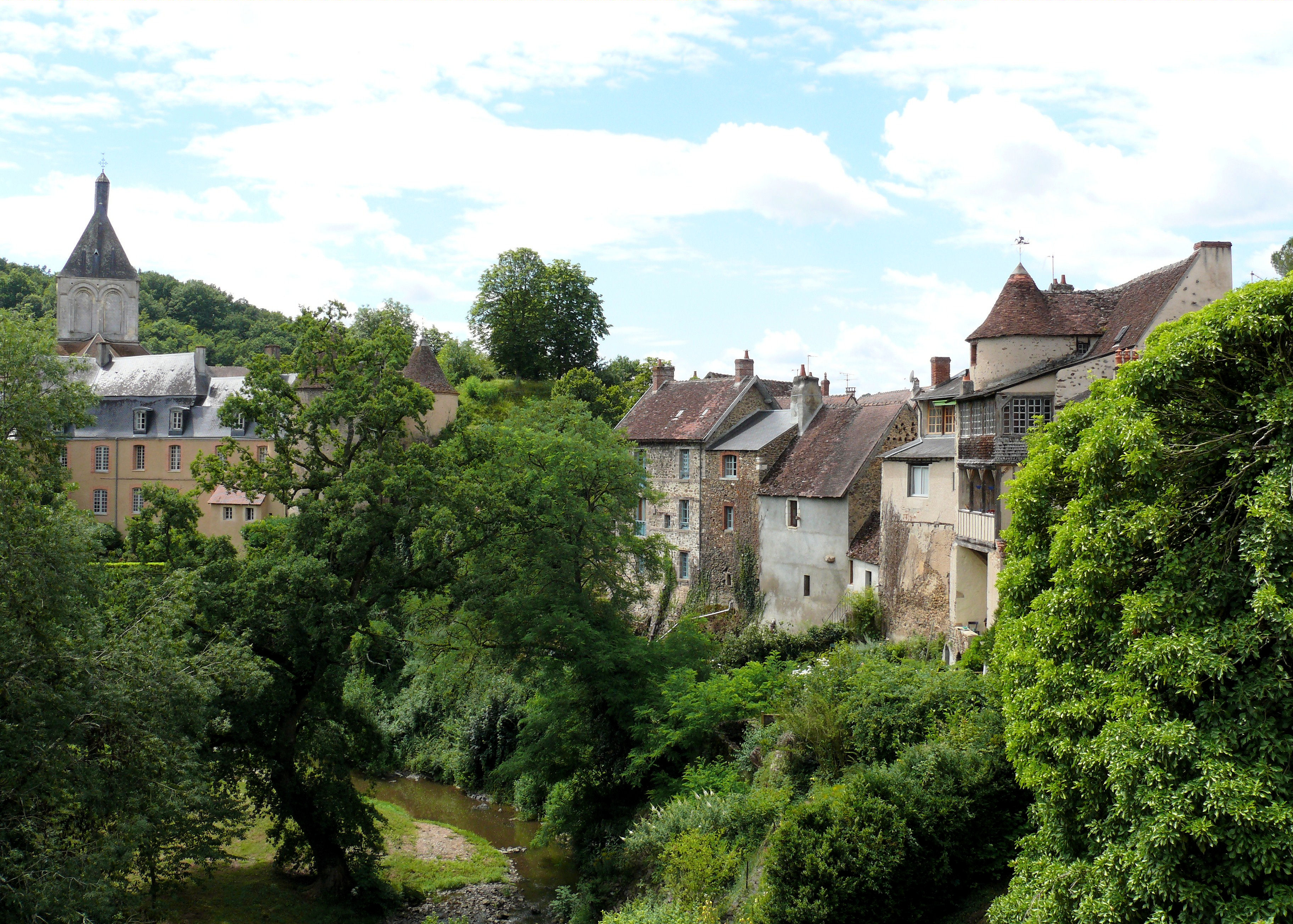
Gargilesse-Dampierre

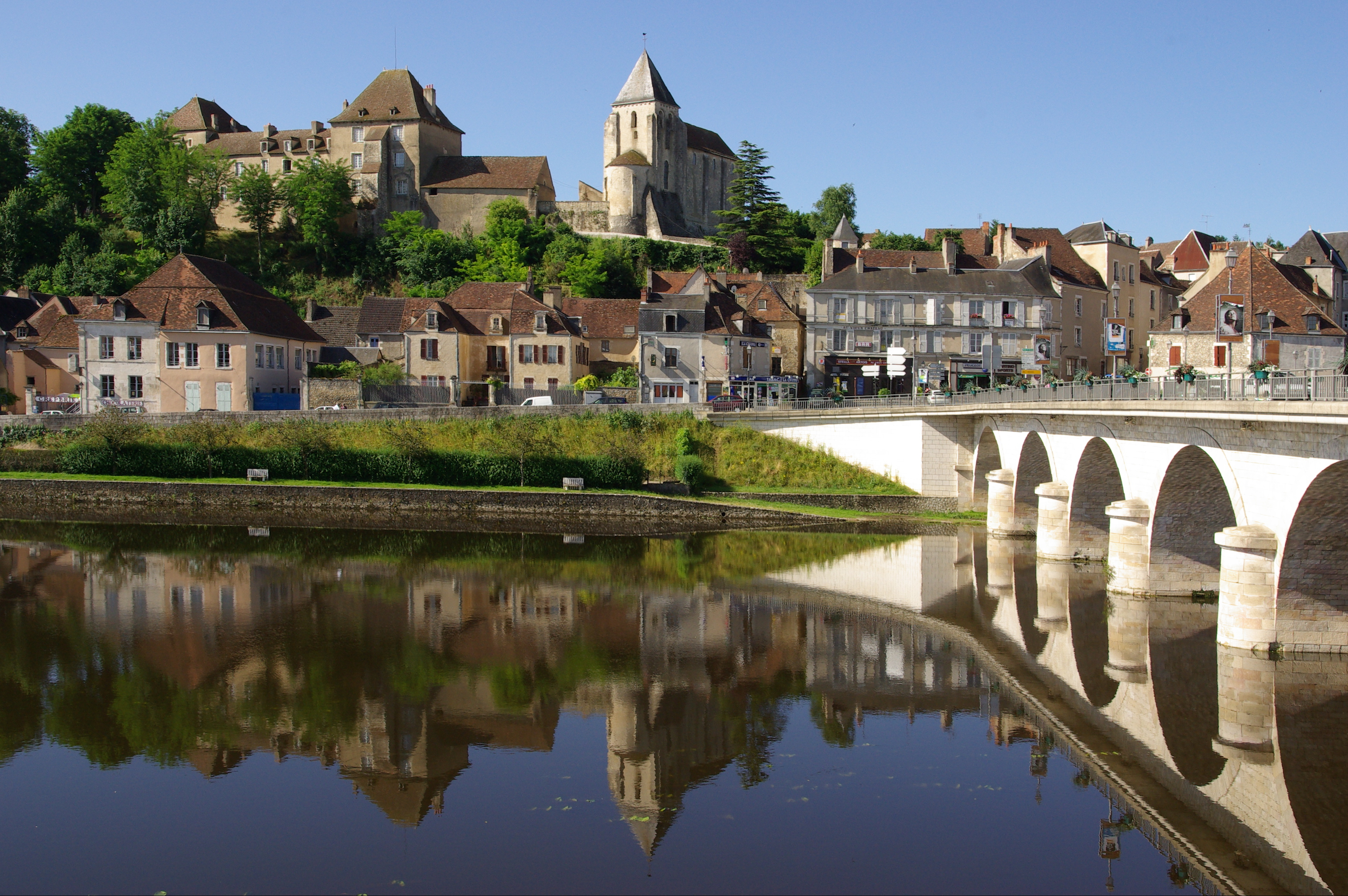
Le Blanc

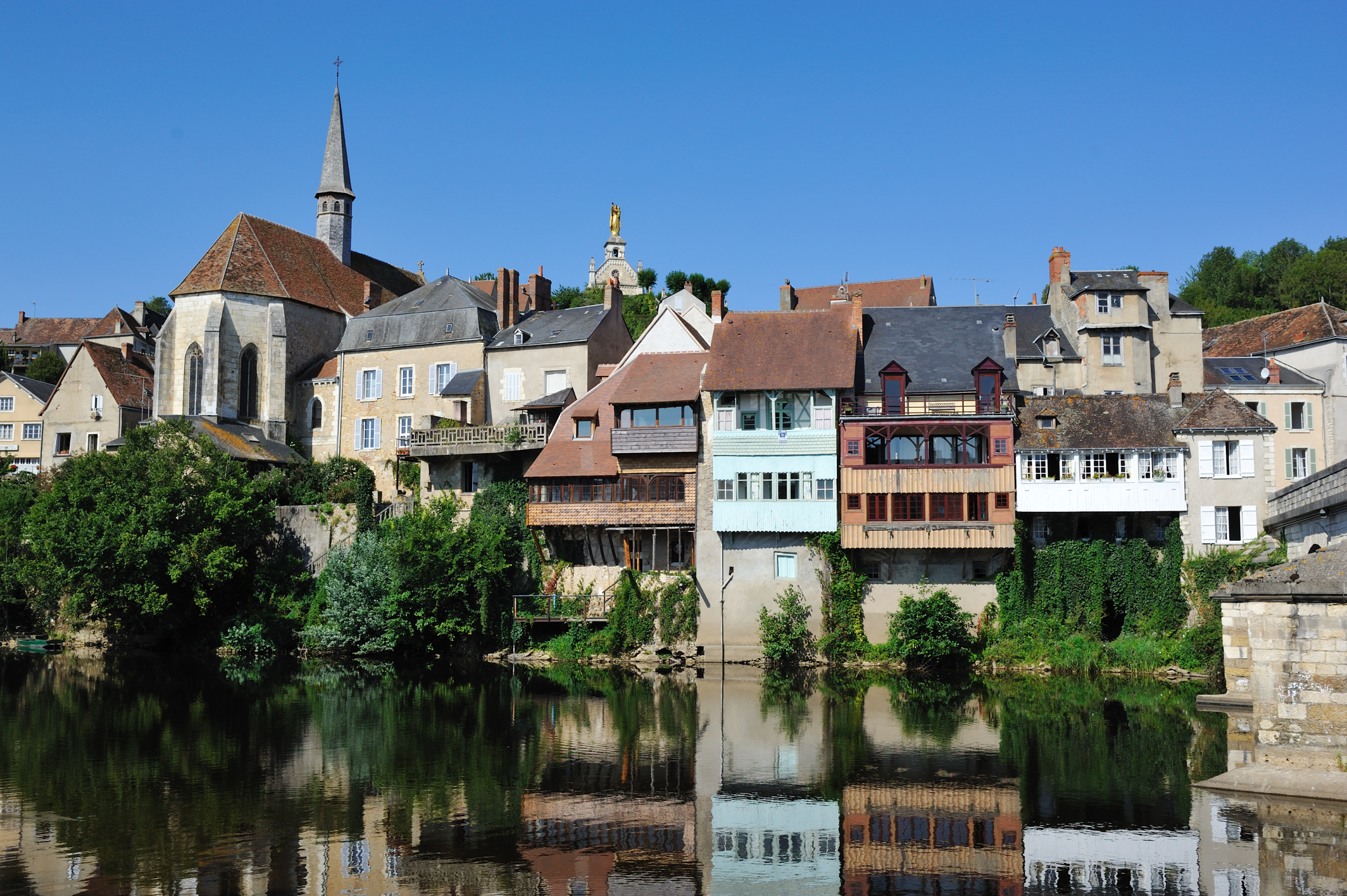
Argenton-sur-Creuse

== See also ==
- Cantons of the Indre department
- Communes of the Indre department
- Arrondissements of the Indre department
