= Issoudun (disambiguation) =

Issoudun may refer to:

- Issoudun, Indre, a commune in the Indre department, France
  - Canton of Issoudun, a canton centered in Issoudun, Indre
  - Arrondissement of Issoudun, an arrondissement centered in Issoudun, Indre
  - Issoudun Aerodrome, an aerodrome in Issoudun, Indre
- Issoudun-Létrieix, a village in the Creuse department, France
- Issoudun, Quebec, a municipality in Quebec, Canada.

== See also ==
- Exoudun
