= Saint-Ambroix =

Saint-Ambroix is the name or part of the name of several communes in France:

- Saint-Ambroix, in the Cher department
- Saint-Ambroix, in the Gard department
