= Yves du Manoir =

France international rugby union player

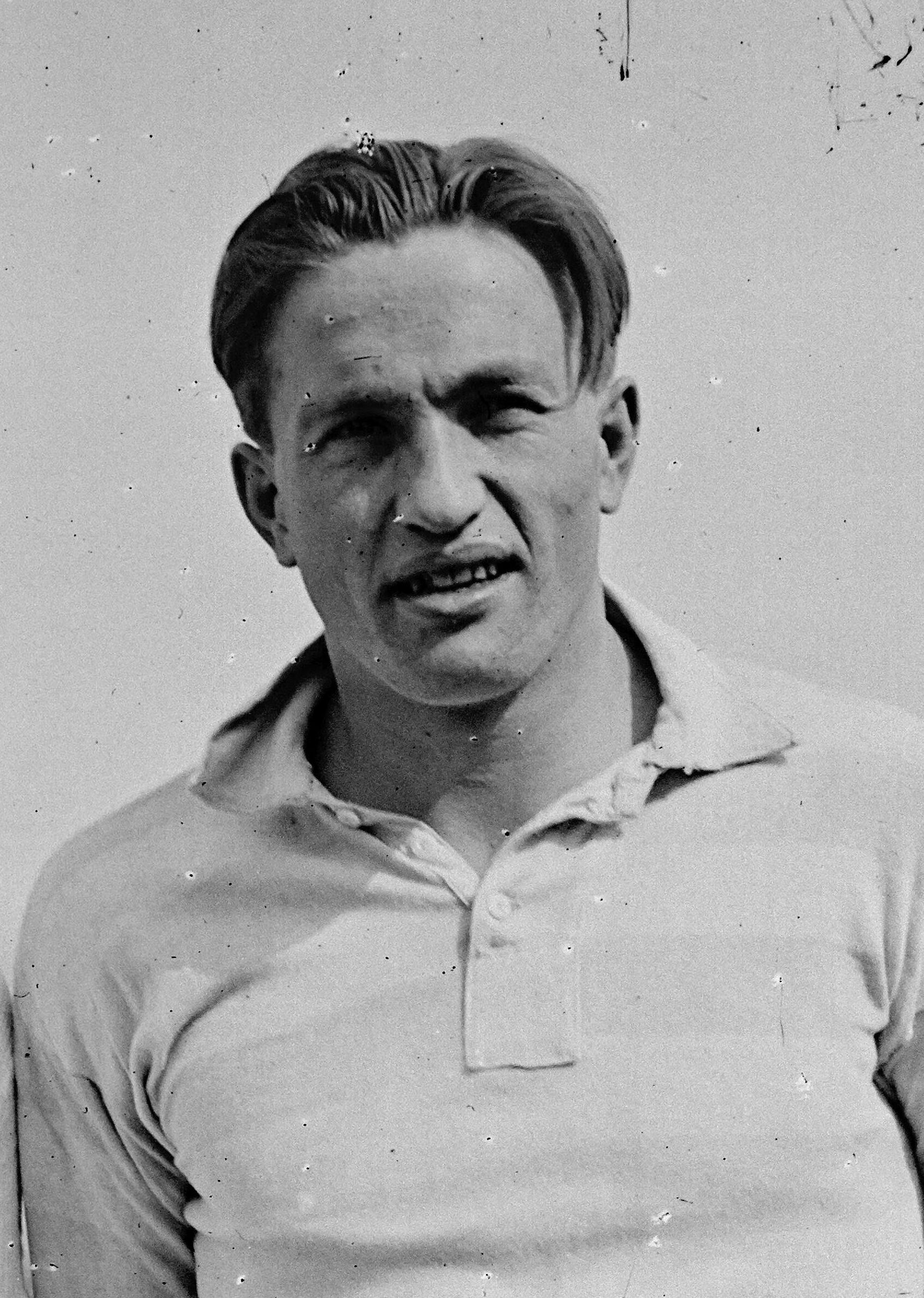
- du Manoir in 1925
- Born: 11 August 1904 Vaucresson, France
- Died: 2 January 1928 (aged 23) Reuilly, France
- Height: 1.70 m (5 ft 7 in)

Rugby union career
- Position: Fly-half
Amateur team(s)
Years	Team	Apps	(Points)
1923–1927	Racing CF		
International career
Years	Team	Apps	(Points)
1925–1927	France	8	(4)

Yves Frantz Loys Marie Le Pelley du Manoir, known as Yves du Manoir (11 August 1904 – 2 January 1928) was a French rugby player.

Du Manoir was born at Vaucresson, into an aristocratic family; his father and mother were Viscount and Viscountess Le Pelley. He excelled at tennis, rowing, swimming, gymnastics and running. He also liked motorcycles. But it was as a rugby player that he stood out. He joined Racing Club de France, a Paris club, as he lived in the prestigious Rue de Rennes in the centre of the city. He was a versatile back, a good kicker and an excellent tackler, who played generally as fly-half.

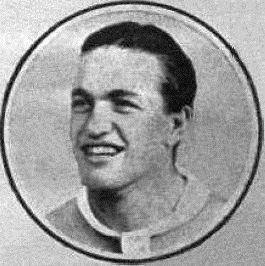
Yves du Manoir

He won his first cap for France, at the age of 20, on 1 January 1925 at Colombes against Ireland. Despite a 9-3 defeat, his flamboyant style made him the darling of the crowd, who chanted his name during the game, and he was chosen as man of the match. He went on to get seven other caps, one as captain against Scotland in 1927.

Considered by contemporary French media as an "epitome of the perfect gentleman", Du Manoir enrolled at the prestigious military school École polytechnique, where he graduated as an air force second lieutenant in 1925.

On 2 January 1928, France played Scotland, but Du Manoir had to decline the invitation because that day he had to take an exam at the military camp where he was officially stationed (in Avord, near Bourges) to obtain his diploma that would allow him to qualify as a military pilot. He died when his Caudron C.59 crashed into poplar trees. The players did not learn of the accident until the after-match functions. Georges Gerald, the France vice-captain and close friend of Du Manoir's with whom he played for Racing as centre, burst into tears as he was making the traditional speech.

A monument was built where the accident happened. Barely four months after his death, Racing Club de France renamed the stadium in his memory. France subsequently played almost all their international home fixtures at the ground until 1973. There is a statue of Du Manoir at the entrance of the stadium, where Racing Club de France played until 2017.

In 1932, Racing Club de France inaugurated a famous club competition named after him, the Challenge Yves du Manoir, dedicated to the spirit of open play.
