= Michel Bouchonnet =

French gymnast

- Born: 17 July 1940 (age 86) Reuilly, France
- Height: 1.70 m (5 ft 7 in)

Gymnastics career
- Discipline: Men's artistic gymnastics
- Country represented: France
- Club: Issoudun

Michel Bouchonnet (born 17 July 1940) is a French gymnast. He competed at the 1964 and 1968 Summer Olympics.
