= Issoudun =

- Subprefecture and commune
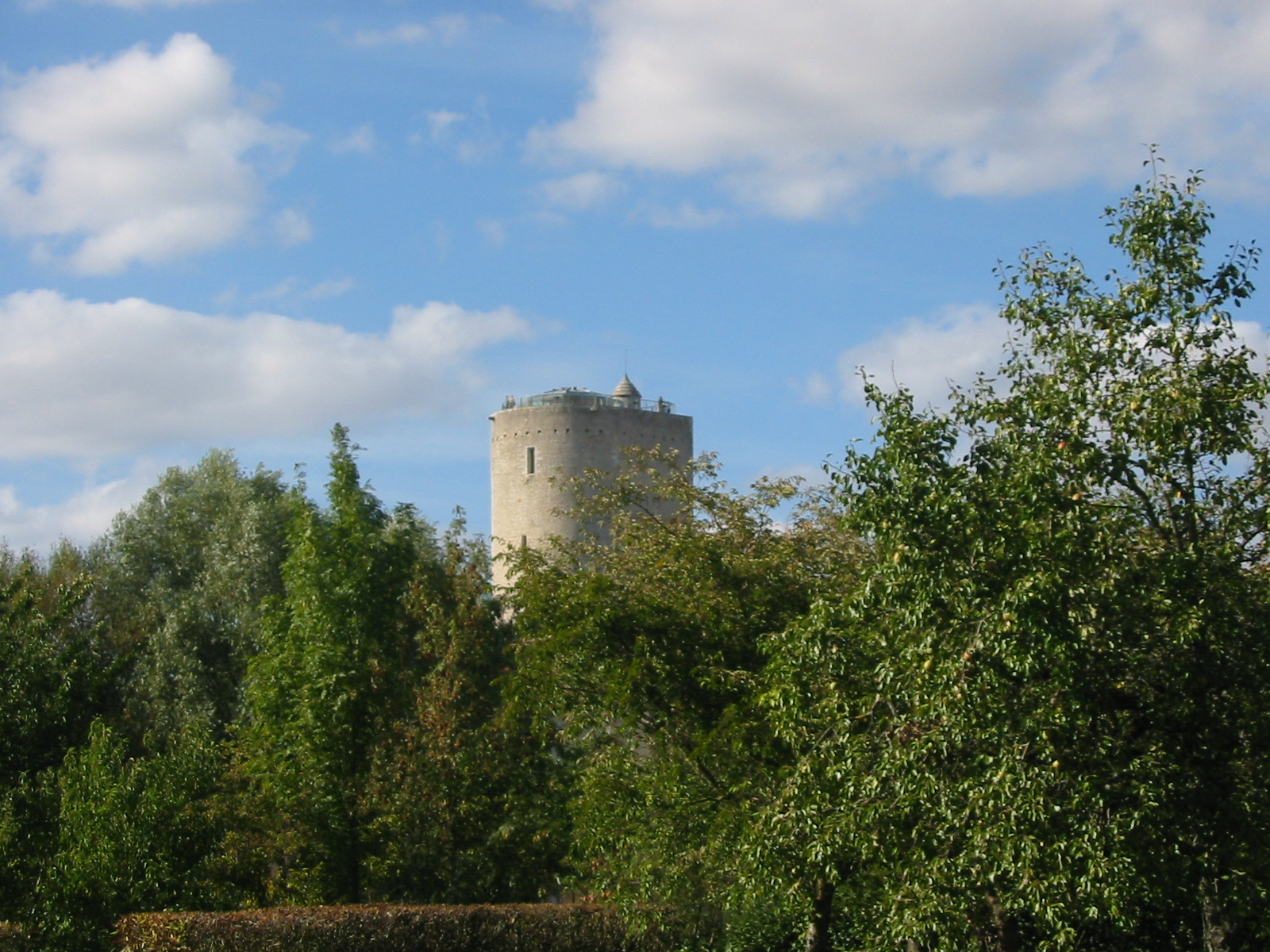
- White tower

- Coat of arms
- Location of Issoudun
- Location within France Location within Centre-Val de Loire
- Coordinates: 46°57′39″N 1°59′40″E
- Country: France
- Region: Centre-Val de Loire
- Department: Indre
- Arrondissement: Issoudun
- Canton: Issoudun
- Intercommunality: CC Pays d'Issoudun

Government
  - Mayor (2026–32): Julien Dubot
- Area^{1}: 36.60 km^{2} (14.13 sq mi)
- Elevation: 129 m (423 ft)
- Highest elevation: 161 m (528 ft)
- Lowest elevation: 122 m (400 ft)
- Population (2023): 11,159
  - Density: 304.9/km^{2} (789.7/sq mi)
- Time zone: UTC+01:00 (CET)
  - Summer (DST): UTC+02:00 (CEST)
- INSEE/Postal code: 36088 /36100
- ^{1} French Land Register data, which excludes lakes, ponds, glaciers > 1 km^{2} (0.386 sq mi or 247 acres) and river estuaries.

Issoudun (French pronunciation: [isudœ̃]) is a commune in the Indre department, administrative region of Centre-Val de Loire, France. It is also referred to as Issoundun, which is the ancient name.

== Geography ==
=== Location ===
Issoudun is a sub-prefecture, located in the east of the Indre department. It is in the former region of Berry. The surrounding communes are:

- Les Bordes (4 km)
- Saint-Aoustrille (5 km)
- St. Lizaigne (7 km)
- Chouday (7 km)
- Lizeray (8 km)
- Condé (8 km)
- Thizay (8 km)
- Saint-Georges-sur-Arnon (10 km)
- Saint-Ambroix (10 km)
- Saugy (10 km)
- Saint-Aubin (11 km)
- Châteauroux (27 km)
- Châtre (41 km)
- Le Blanc (79 km)

=== Terrain ===
The river of Théols passes through Issoudun.

The commune of Issoudun takes up an area of 36.6 km^{2}.

=== Transport ===
The national road N151 passes through the area.

The nearest airport is the Marcel Dassault Airport, 27 km away.

The Issoudun station is located at 4 Pierre Favreau boulevard, 36100.

== History ==
=== Origins ===
Issoudun, in Latin Exoldunum or Uxellodunum, existed in and before Roman times. In 1195 it was successfully defended by the partisans of Richard Cœur de Lion against Philip II of France.

=== Middle Ages ===
During the 12th and 13th century, the history of the entire province of Berry, including the Lordship of Issoudun, was marked by the Capetian–Plantagenet rivalry. In 1195, Richard I of England defended the city from the advances of Philip II of France. The two kings met in December 1195 between Issoudun and Chârost, and reached an agreement, known as the Treaty of Issoudun. Around this time the beak-shaped keep of the castle was built. By the Treaty of Le Goulet (1200), Lords of Issoudun (French: Seigneurs d'Issoudun) returned to the suzerainty of the French Crown. The most prominent Lords of Issoudun from that period were Odo III and his son Raoul III, who was married to Margaret of Courtenay. Since Raoul III of Issoudun died (c. 1213) without direct male heirs, the Lordship was passed to several secondary heirs, through the female line of succession. First of them was William I of Chauvigny (French: Guillaume I de Chauvigny) in 1217, but final settlement was reached in 1221, after the intervention of the French Crown.

In 1499, Cesare Borgia, son of Pope Alexander VI, married Charlotte d'Albret, and as a dowry, was given, amongst other titles, the Lordship of Issoudun.

Issoudun has in the past often suffered from fires. A very destructive one in 1651 was the result of an attack on the town in the war of The Fronde; Louis XIV rewarded its fidelity to him during that struggle by the grant of several privileges.

=== World War I ===
In 1917, the U.S. Air Service established its largest European training centre, the 3rd Aviation Instruction Center, about 14 km (9 mi) northwest of the town. At the time of the Armistice, 11 November 1918, thirteen fields were in operation and well over 10,000 ground personnel, student pilots and instructors were located there. It was at that time the largest air base in the world. A single monument on Department Route 960 remains to mark Issoudun's part in the Great War.

The United States Air Service formally left Issoudun on 28 June 1919, almost eight months after the war ended. The sites of the former airfields have returned to their previous status as agricultural fields.

On 28 June 2009, the people of Issoudun had a commemoration ceremony in honour of the American aviators who had trained, and in many cases, died while training there.

=== Recent Events ===
On 14 July 2009, Bastille Day, Issoudun hosted the arrival of the 10th stage of the Tour De France.

== Politics and administration ==
=== Territorial division ===
Issoudun is a member of:

- The Communauté de communes du Pays d'Issoudun.
- The Canton of Issoudun.
- The Arrondissement of Issoudun.
- Indre's 2nd constituency.

Between 1973 and 2015 the commune was also attached to and divided by the two cantons of Issoudun-Nord and Issoudun-Sud.

== Population ==
Historical population

Year	Pop.	±% p.a.
1793	13,491	—
1800	10,265	−3.83%
1806	10,719	+0.72%
1821	11,077	+0.22%
1831	11,664	+0.52%
1836	11,654	−0.02%
1841	12,234	+0.98%
1846	12,852	+0.99%
1851	13,346	+0.76%
1856	13,320	−0.04%
1861	14,282	+1.40%
1866	14,261	−0.03%
1872	14,230	−0.04%
1876	13,703	−0.94%
1881	14,928	+1.73%
1886	15,231	+0.40%
1891	13,564	−2.29%
1896	14,116	+0.80%
1901	14,222	+0.15%

Year	Pop.	±% p.a.
1906	13,949	−0.39%
1911	13,709	−0.35%
1921	11,893	−1.41%
1926	11,809	−0.14%
1931	11,684	−0.21%
1936	11,511	−0.30%
1946	12,645	+0.94%
1954	12,945	+0.29%
1962	13,900	+0.89%
1968	15,108	+1.40%
1975	15,956	+0.78%
1982	14,696	−1.17%
1990	13,859	−0.73%
1999	13,685	−0.14%
2007	13,627	−0.05%
2012	12,661	−1.46%
2017	11,905	−1.22%
2023	11,159	−1.07%

Source: EHESS and INSEE (1968-2023)

== Landmarks ==
Among the interesting buildings are the church of St Cyr, combining various architectural styles, with a fine porch and window, and the chapel of the Hôtel Dieu of the early 16th century. Of the fortifications with which the town was formerly surrounded, a town-gate of the 16th century and the White Tower, a lofty cylindrical building of the reign of Philip II, survive.

RFI at Issoudun

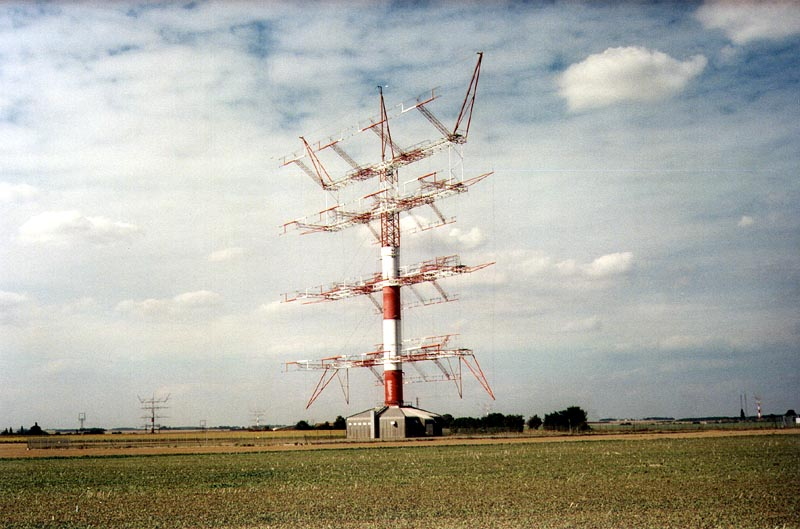
Volga ALLISS Module

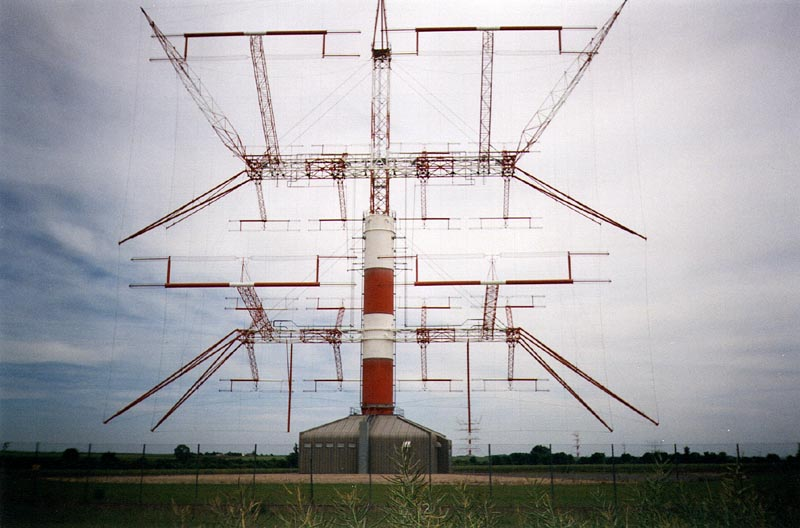
Ganges ALLISS Module

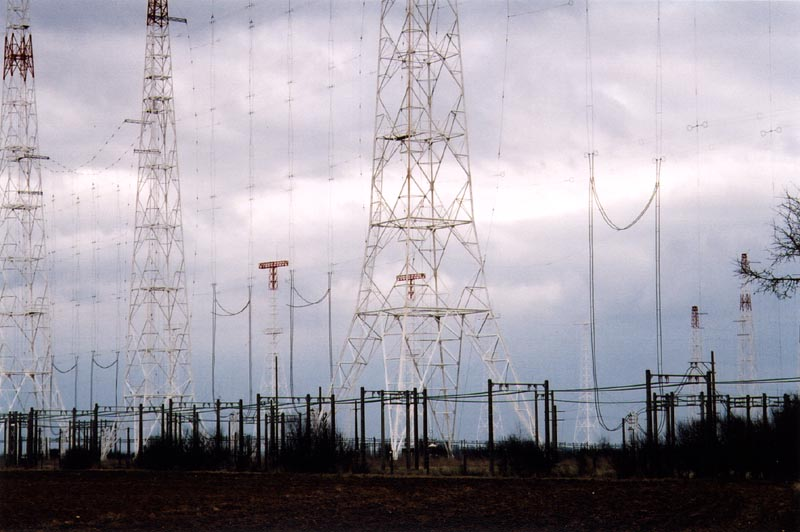
Former RFI Issoudun Relay station feeders and curtain arrays

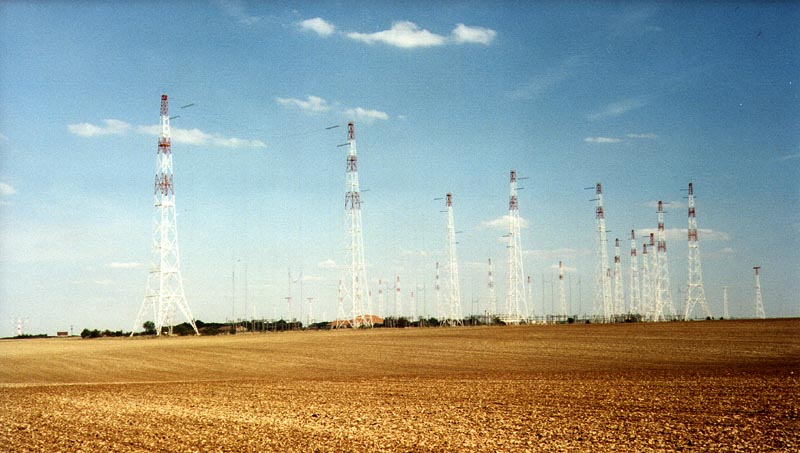
Former RFI Issoudun Relay curtain arrays (1990s)

The International broadcasting center of TDF (Télédiffusion de France) is at Issoudun/Ste Aoustrille. Issoudun is currently used by TDF for shortwave transmissions. The site uses 12 rotary ALLISS antennas fed by 12 transmitters of 500 kW each to transmit shortwave broadcasts by Radio France International (RFI), along with other broadcast services.

== In popular culture ==
Issoudun figures prominently in Balzac's novel A Bachelor's Establishment (also known as The Black Sheep) which the Guardian has ranked as the 12th greatest novel of all time.

== Culture ==
Issoudun is home to the Musée de l'Hospice Saint Roch, that consistently hosts contemporary art exhibitions.

== Twin towns ==
Issoudin is twinned with:

- (Quebec) Notre-Dame-du-Sacré-Cœur-d'Issoudun, Canada, Québec, since 1977

== See also ==
- Issoudun Aerodrome
- Communes of the Indre department
- Arrondissements of the Indre department
- Anglo-French War (1202-1204)
- Anglo-French War (1213-1214)

== Sources ==
- Abbott, Paul D. (1981). Provinces, pays, and seigneuries of France. Myrtleford, Australia. ISBN 9780959377309.
- Devailly, Guy (1973). Le Berry du Xe siècle au milieu du XIIIe: Étude politique, religieuse, sociale, et économique. Paris-La Haye: Mouton. ISBN 9783111631066.
