= Mareuil-sur-Arnon =

- Commune
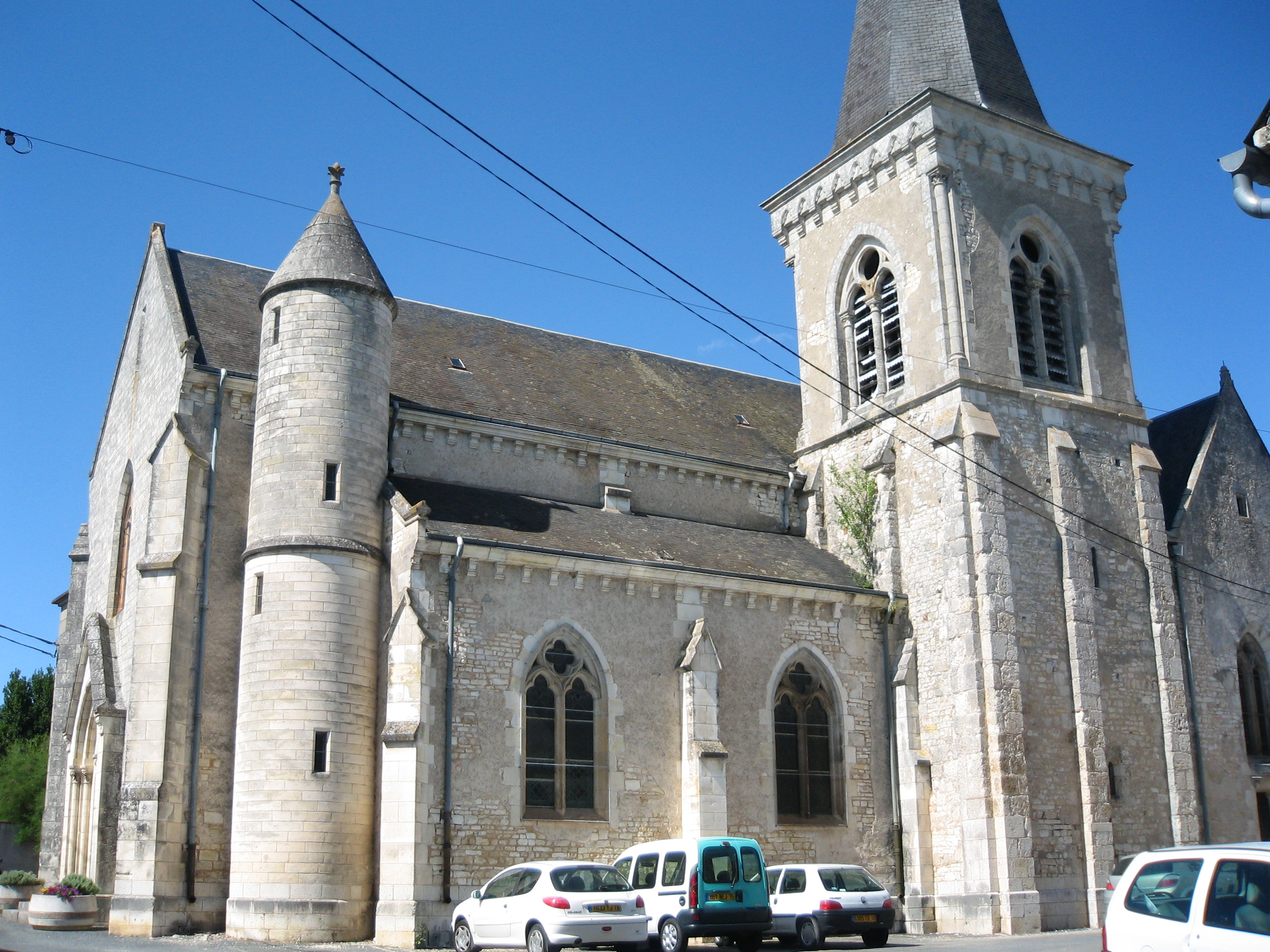
- The church of Our Lady of the Assumption, in Mareuil
- Location of Mareuil-sur-Arnon
- Location within France Location within Centre-Val de Loire
- Coordinates: 46°52′55″N 2°09′36″E
- Country: France
- Region: Centre-Val de Loire
- Department: Cher
- Arrondissement: Bourges
- Canton: Chârost
- Intercommunality: CC FerCher

Government
  - Mayor (2020–2026): François Legnier
- Area^{1}: 25.89 km^{2} (10.00 sq mi)
- Elevation: 155 m (509 ft)
- Highest elevation: 172 m (564 ft)
- Lowest elevation: 132 m (433 ft)
- Population (2023): 487
  - Density: 18.8/km^{2} (48.7/sq mi)
- Time zone: UTC+01:00 (CET)
  - Summer (DST): UTC+02:00 (CEST)
- INSEE/Postal code: 18137 /18290
- ^{1} French Land Register data, which excludes lakes, ponds, glaciers > 1 km^{2} (0.386 sq mi or 247 acres) and river estuaries.

Mareuil-sur-Arnon (French pronunciation: [maʁœj syʁ aʁnɔ̃], literally Mareuil on Arnon) is a commune in the Cher department in the Centre-Val de Loire region of France.

== Geography ==
A forestry and farming area comprising the village and several hamlets situated by the banks of the river Arnon, some 18 miles (29 km) southwest of Bourges, at the junction of the D18, D14 and the D87 roads. The commune shares its north-western border with the departement of Indre.

== Population ==
Historical population
Year	Pop.	±% p.a.
1968	822	—
1975	715	−1.97%
1982	659	−1.16%
1990	611	−0.94%
1999	591	−0.37%
2007	591	+0.00%
2012	550	−1.43%
2017	532	−0.66%
2023	487	−1.46%
Source: INSEE

== Sights ==
- The church of St. Pierre, rebuilt in the nineteenth century.
- A watermill.
- The ruined towers of a feudal castle.

== See also ==
- Communes of the Cher department
