= Civray, Cher =

Civray
- Commune
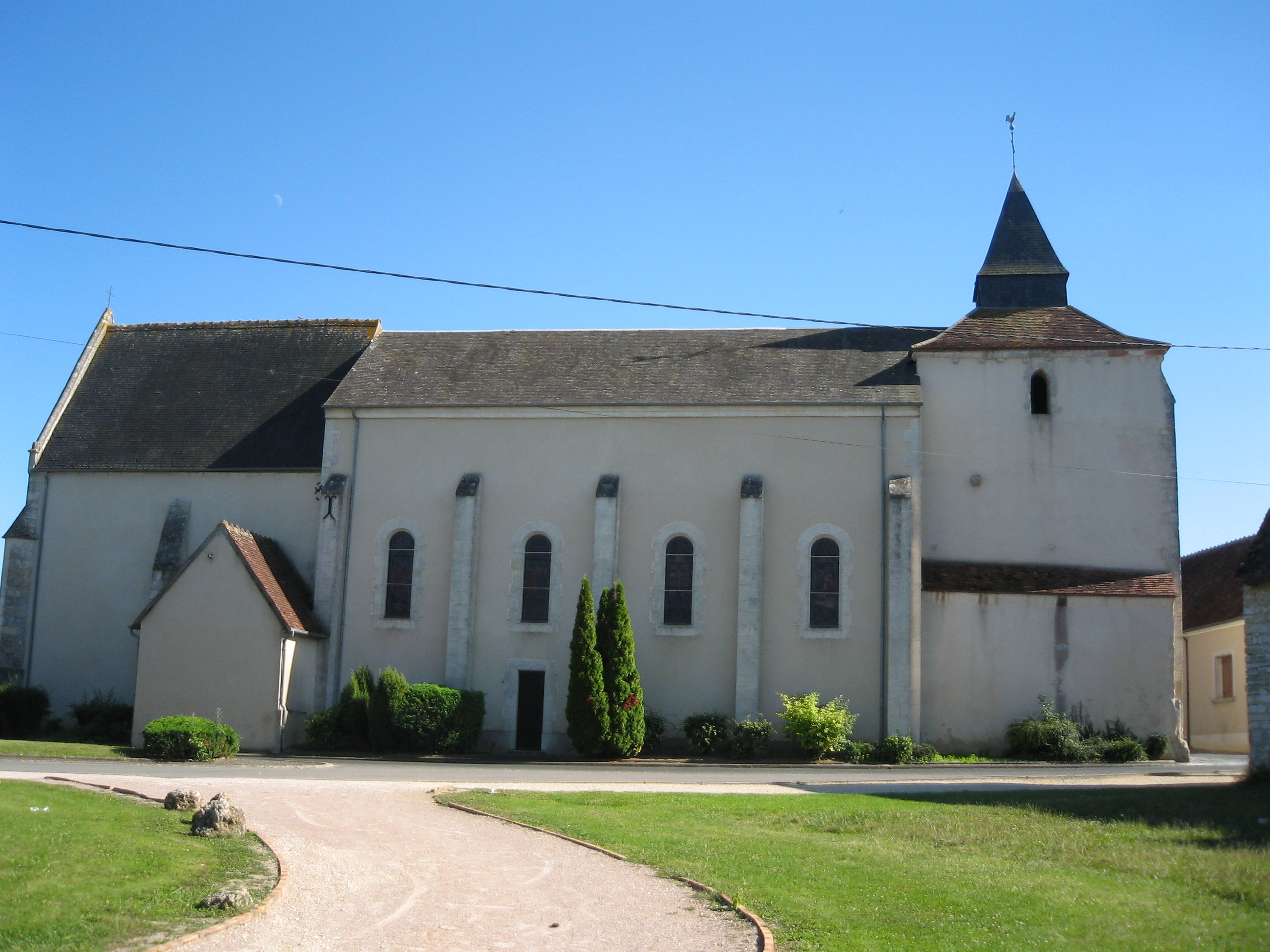
- The church in Civray

- Coat of arms
- Location of Civray
- Location within France Location within Centre-Val de Loire
- Coordinates: 46°58′05″N 2°10′30″E
- Country: France
- Region: Centre-Val de Loire
- Department: Cher
- Arrondissement: Bourges
- Canton: Chârost
- Intercommunality: CC FerCher

Government
  - Mayor (2020–2026): Sonia Pazos-Monvoisin
- Area^{1}: 40.87 km^{2} (15.78 sq mi)
- Elevation: 155 m (509 ft)
- Highest elevation: 162 m (531 ft)
- Lowest elevation: 125 m (410 ft)
- Population (2023): 926
  - Density: 22.7/km^{2} (58.7/sq mi)
- Time zone: UTC+01:00 (CET)
  - Summer (DST): UTC+02:00 (CEST)
- INSEE/Postal code: 18066 /18290
- ^{1} French Land Register data, which excludes lakes, ponds, glaciers > 1 km^{2} (0.386 sq mi or 247 acres) and river estuaries.

Civray (French pronunciation: [sivʁɛ]) is a commune in the Cher department in the Centre-Val de Loire region of France.

== Geography ==
A farming area comprising the village and several hamlets situated in the valley of the river Pontet some 15 miles (24 km) southwest of Bourges at the junction of the N151 with the D88, D184 and D84 roads.

== Population ==
Historical population
Year	Pop.	±% p.a.
1968	893	—
1975	840	−0.87%
1982	813	−0.47%
1990	1,023	+2.91%
1999	1,004	−0.21%
2007	1,001	−0.04%
2012	1,008	+0.14%
2017	920	−1.81%
2023	926	+0.11%
Source: INSEE

== Sights ==
- The church of St. Pierre, dating from the twelfth century.
- Traces of a medieval castle.

== See also ==
- Communes of the Cher department
