= Saugy =

- Commune
- Coat of arms
- Location of Saugy
- Location within France Location within Centre-Val de Loire
- Coordinates: 46°58′16″N 2°07′05″E
- Country: France
- Region: Centre-Val de Loire
- Department: Cher
- Arrondissement: Bourges
- Canton: Chârost
- Intercommunality: CC FerCher

Government
  - Mayor (2020–2026): Erick Audebert
- Area^{1}: 9.63 km^{2} (3.72 sq mi)
- Elevation: 180 m (590 ft)
- Highest elevation: 162 m (531 ft)
- Lowest elevation: 122 m (400 ft)
- Population (2023): 77
  - Density: 8.0/km^{2} (21/sq mi)
- Time zone: UTC+01:00 (CET)
  - Summer (DST): UTC+02:00 (CEST)
- INSEE/Postal code: 18244 /18290
- ^{1} French Land Register data, which excludes lakes, ponds, glaciers > 1 km^{2} (0.386 sq mi or 247 acres) and river estuaries.

Saugy (French pronunciation: [soʒi]) is a commune in the Cher department in the Centre-Val de Loire region of France.

== Geography ==
A very small farming village situated in the valley of the river Arnon, about 15 miles (24 km) southwest of Bourges, at the junction of the D18 and the D149 roads. The commune borders the department of Indre.

== Population ==
Historical population
Year	Pop.	±% p.a.
1968	99	—
1975	67	−5.42%
1982	57	−2.28%
1990	69	+2.42%
1999	69	+0.00%
2007	57	−2.36%
2012	85	+8.32%
2017	79	−1.45%
2023	77	−0.43%
Source: INSEE

== Sights ==
- The church of St. Ursule, dating from the twelfth century.

== See also ==
- Communes of the Cher department
