= Morthomiers =

- Commune
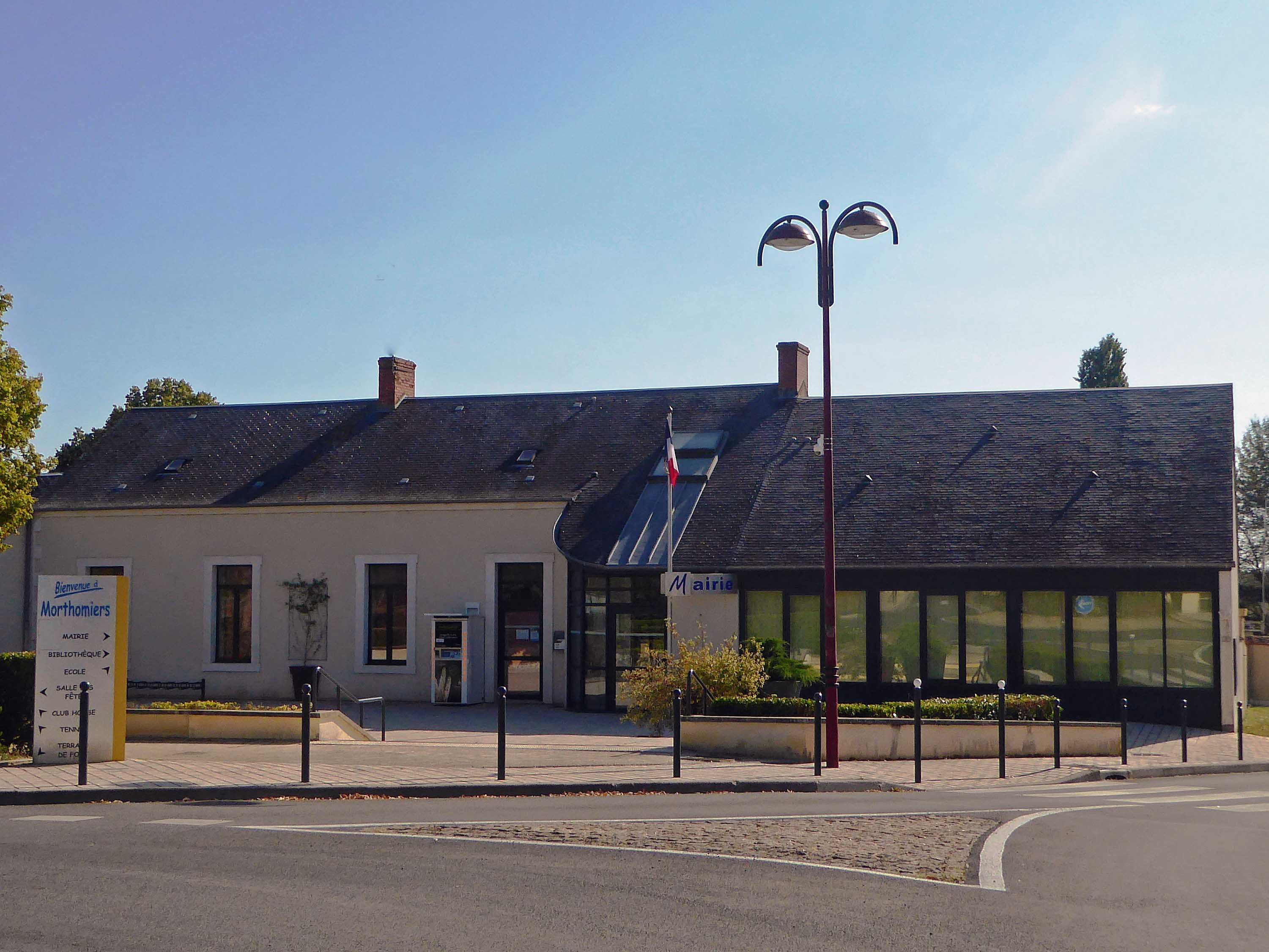
- Morthomiers Town hall

- Coat of arms
- Location of Morthomiers
- Location within France Location within Centre-Val de Loire
- Coordinates: 47°02′16″N 2°16′39″E
- Country: France
- Region: Centre-Val de Loire
- Department: Cher
- Arrondissement: Bourges
- Canton: Chârost
- Intercommunality: CA Bourges Plus

Government
  - Mayor (2023–2026): Fabrice Archambault
- Area^{1}: 14.54 km^{2} (5.61 sq mi)
- Highest elevation: 157 m (515 ft)
- Lowest elevation: 124 m (407 ft)
- Population (2023): 845
  - Density: 58.1/km^{2} (151/sq mi)
- Time zone: UTC+01:00 (CET)
  - Summer (DST): UTC+02:00 (CEST)
- INSEE/Postal code: 18157 /18570
- ^{1} French Land Register data, which excludes lakes, ponds, glaciers > 1 km^{2} (0.386 sq mi or 247 acres) and river estuaries.

Morthomiers (French pronunciation: [mɔʁtɔmje]) is a commune in the Cher department in the Centre-Val de Loire region of France.

== Geography ==
An area of forestry and farming comprising the village and a hamlet situated some 6 miles (9.7 km) southwest of Vierzon at the junction of the D16 and the D135 roads. The commune lies on the pilgrimage route known as Saint James's Way.

== Population ==
Historical population
Year	Pop.	±% p.a.
1968	204	—
1975	218	+0.95%
1982	409	+9.41%
1990	590	+4.69%
1999	589	−0.02%
2007	673	+1.68%
2012	741	+1.94%
2017	761	+0.53%
2023	845	+1.76%
Source: INSEE

== See also ==
- Communes of the Cher department
