= Les Bordes, Indre =

Les Bordes
- Commune
- Location of Les Bordes
- Location within France Location within Centre-Val de Loire
- Coordinates: 46°58′54″N 1°58′35″E
- Country: France
- Region: Centre-Val de Loire
- Department: Indre
- Arrondissement: Issoudun
- Canton: Issoudun
- Intercommunality: CC Pays d'Issoudun

Government
  - Mayor (2020–2026): Carole Vitte
- Area^{1}: 16.3 km^{2} (6.3 sq mi)
- Elevation: 176 m (577 ft)
- Highest elevation: 164 m (538 ft)
- Lowest elevation: 123 m (404 ft)
- Population (2023): 792
  - Density: 48.6/km^{2} (126/sq mi)
- Time zone: UTC+01:00 (CET)
  - Summer (DST): UTC+02:00 (CEST)
- INSEE/Postal code: 36021 /36100
- ^{1} French Land Register data, which excludes lakes, ponds, glaciers > 1 km^{2} (0.386 sq mi or 247 acres) and river estuaries.

Les Bordes (French pronunciation: [le bɔʁd]) is a commune in the Indre département in central France.

== Population ==
Historical population
| Year | Pop. | ±% p.a. |
|---|---|---|
| 1968 | 598 | — |
| 1975 | 564 | −0.83% |
| 1982 | 771 | +4.57% |
| 1990 | 925 | +2.30% |
| 1999 | 936 | +0.13% |
| 2007 | 943 | +0.09% |
| 2012 | 906 | −0.80% |
| 2017 | 895 | −0.24% |
| 2023 | 792 | −2.02% |
Source: INSEE

== See also ==
- Communes of the Indre department
