= Saint-Florent-sur-Cher =

- Commune
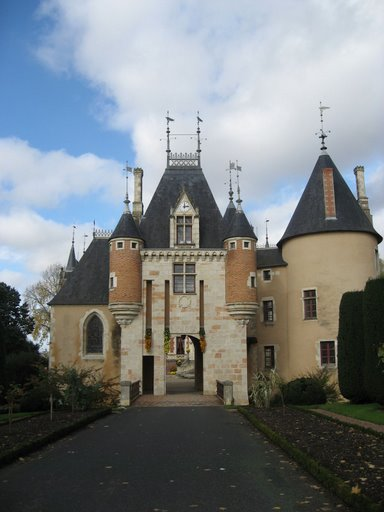
- Town hall

- Coat of arms
- Location of Saint-Florent-sur-Cher
- Location within France Location within Centre-Val de Loire
- Coordinates: 46°59′47″N 2°15′09″E
- Country: France
- Region: Centre-Val de Loire
- Department: Cher
- Arrondissement: Bourges
- Canton: Chârost
- Intercommunality: CC FerCher

Government
  - Mayor (2023–2026): Marie-Line Cirre
- Area^{1}: 22.41 km^{2} (8.65 sq mi)
- Elevation: 157 m (515 ft)
- Highest elevation: 164 m (538 ft)
- Lowest elevation: 117 m (384 ft)
- Population (2023): 6,463
  - Density: 288.4/km^{2} (746.9/sq mi)
- Time zone: UTC+01:00 (CET)
  - Summer (DST): UTC+02:00 (CEST)
- INSEE/Postal code: 18207 /18400
- ^{1} French Land Register data, which excludes lakes, ponds, glaciers > 1 km^{2} (0.386 sq mi or 247 acres) and river estuaries.

Saint-Florent-sur-Cher (French pronunciation: [sɛ̃ flɔʁɑ̃ syʁ ʃɛʁ], literally Saint-Florent on Cher) is a commune in the Cher department in central France.

== Population ==
Historical population
| Year | Pop. | ±% p.a. |
|---|---|---|
| 1968 | 6,408 | — |
| 1975 | 6,535 | +0.28% |
| 1982 | 7,611 | +2.20% |
| 1990 | 7,358 | −0.42% |
| 1999 | 6,900 | −0.71% |
| 2007 | 6,724 | −0.32% |
| 2012 | 6,617 | −0.32% |
| 2017 | 6,537 | −0.24% |
| 2023 | 6,463 | −0.19% |
Source: INSEE

== See also ==
- Communes of the Cher department
