= Villeneuve-sur-Cher =

- Commune
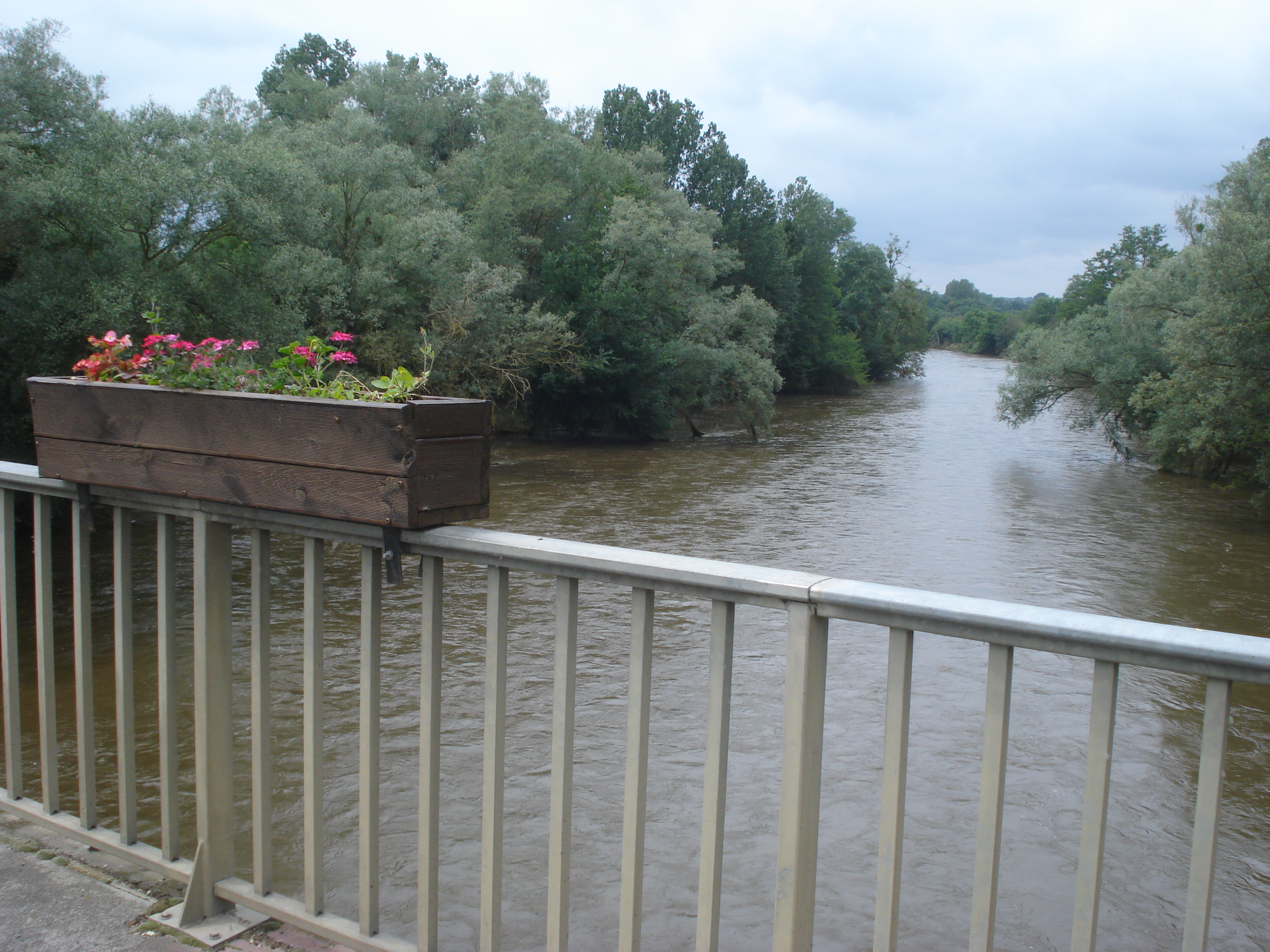
- The river Cher
- Location of Villeneuve-sur-Cher
- Location within France Location within Centre-Val de Loire
- Coordinates: 47°01′47″N 2°13′27″E
- Country: France
- Region: Centre-Val de Loire
- Department: Cher
- Arrondissement: Bourges
- Canton: Chârost
- Intercommunality: CC FerCher

Government
  - Mayor (2020–2026): Michel Herault
- Area^{1}: 26.13 km^{2} (10.09 sq mi)
- Highest elevation: 159 m (522 ft)
- Lowest elevation: 113 m (371 ft)
- Population (2023): 402
  - Density: 15.4/km^{2} (39.8/sq mi)
- Time zone: UTC+01:00 (CET)
  - Summer (DST): UTC+02:00 (CEST)
- INSEE/Postal code: 18285 /18400
- ^{1} French Land Register data, which excludes lakes, ponds, glaciers > 1 km^{2} (0.386 sq mi or 247 acres) and river estuaries.

Villeneuve-sur-Cher (French pronunciation: [vilnœv syʁ ʃɛʁ]) is a commune in the Cher department in the Centre-Val de Loire region of France.

== Geography ==
An area of forestry and farming comprising the village and a couple of hamlets situated on the banks of the river Cher, about 9 miles (14 km) southeast of Bourges, at the junction of the D16 with the D35 and D27 roads.

== Population ==
Historical population
Year	Pop.	±% p.a.
1968	358	—
1975	321	−1.55%
1982	371	+2.09%
1990	425	+1.71%
1999	469	+1.10%
2007	417	−1.46%
2012	454	+1.71%
2017	444	−0.44%
2023	402	−1.64%
Source: INSEE

== Sights ==
- The church of St. Pierre, dating from the twelfth century.
- The fifteenth-century fortified house.
- The seventeenth-century manorhouse at Galifart.
- The medieval Beau tower.

== See also ==
- Communes of the Cher department
