= Marguerite-Christine Świrczewska =

Marguerite-Christine Świrczewska (born January 10, 1944 in Warsaw, Poland) is a Polish writer and social activist, promoter of Polish culture in France, philanthropist, vice-chairman of the Polish Chamber of Commerce and Industry in France (fr. Chambre de Commerce et Industrie Polonaise) from 1998 to 2004, and co-founder and honorary president of the Ma Patrie organization.

== Life and work ==
She is a graduate of the high school Liceum im. Marii Curie–Skłodowskiej in Warsaw, Poland. She graduated in pedagogy at the University of Warsaw, under the guidance, among others, of prof. Czesław Czapów. This is where she came into contact for the first time with the psychodrama theory. She completed a research internship at the Centre for Education of Difficult Youth in Vaucresson, France.

She emigrated to France in 1970, and after a few months she moved to the United States, where she lived till 1974. Then she returned to France, living in Cannes.

She was a co-producer of the play Mother (La Mère) – a play by S. I. Witkiewicz staged at the Récamier Theater in Paris by the group La Compagnie Renaud-Barrault (Théâtre Récamier) and adapted by Marguerite Duras. The premiere took place on November 7, 1970 and was a breakthrough for Witkacy's worldwide reception, paving the way for his plays to be staged in many major professional theaters.

From the beginning of her stay in France, she has been involved in philanthropic activities. From 1998 to 1999, she financed the participation of the youth football team from Płock in the Altifoot tournament.

In 2017, together with Agne Gravelot, she established the Ma Patrie organization, that aims at promoting tolerance and fight against discrimination. She became its honorary president.

She has been married three times, successively to Jean–Claude Bachelier, André Woydyllo and Jerzy Lechowski (hence she is also known as Marguerite Bachelier, Marguerite Woydyllo and Marguerite Lechowski).

== Literary work ==
- In 1966, she was writing for a biweekly „Wychowanie", published by Towarzystwo Szkoły Świeckiej.
- In 2019 and 2020, her biographical short stories were published in the literary-artistic magazine "Bezkres".
- In 2020, in „Almanach Poezji Niezłomnej" – a compilation of poetry and prose dedicated to the cursed soldiers – she published a short story about her grandfather Jak poznałam dziadka mojego Romualda Bużkiewicza.
- The same year, she published a short story Duma biało-czerwonej peonii, which came out at the Tradycja – The Tradition website.
- In 2020, the following books were published: Ego-Graphie, or the love life of a Polish emigrant. Vol. 1 with a preface by Guillaume de Louvencourt Poniatowski and Ego-Graphie, or the love life of a Polish emigrant. Vol. 2. Both books were written and published in French, Polish and English. The distributor of the books is the Hachette publishing house.
