= Saint-Georges-sur-Arnon =

- Commune
- Location of Saint-Georges-sur-Arnon
- Location within France Location within Centre-Val de Loire
- Coordinates: 46°59′57″N 2°05′36″E
- Country: France
- Region: Centre-Val de Loire
- Department: Indre
- Arrondissement: Issoudun
- Canton: Issoudun
- Intercommunality: CC Pays d'Issoudun

Government
  - Mayor (2020–2026): Jacques Pallas
- Area^{1}: 23.87 km^{2} (9.22 sq mi)
- Elevation: 130 m (430 ft)
- Highest elevation: 161 m (528 ft)
- Lowest elevation: 117 m (384 ft)
- Population (2023): 548
  - Density: 23.0/km^{2} (59.5/sq mi)
- Time zone: UTC+01:00 (CET)
  - Summer (DST): UTC+02:00 (CEST)
- INSEE/Postal code: 36195 /36100
- ^{1} French Land Register data, which excludes lakes, ponds, glaciers > 1 km^{2} (0.386 sq mi or 247 acres) and river estuaries.

Saint-Georges-sur-Arnon (French pronunciation: [sɛ̃ ʒɔʁʒ syʁ aʁnɔ̃], literally Saint-Georges on Arnon) is a commune in the Indre department in central France.

== Population ==
Historical population
Year	Pop.	±% p.a.
1968	326	—
1975	295	−1.42%
1982	335	+1.83%
1990	383	+1.69%
1999	430	+1.29%
2007	513	+2.23%
2012	567	+2.02%
2017	575	+0.28%
2023	548	−0.80%
Source: INSEE

== See also ==
- Communes of the Indre department
