= Lunery =

- Commune
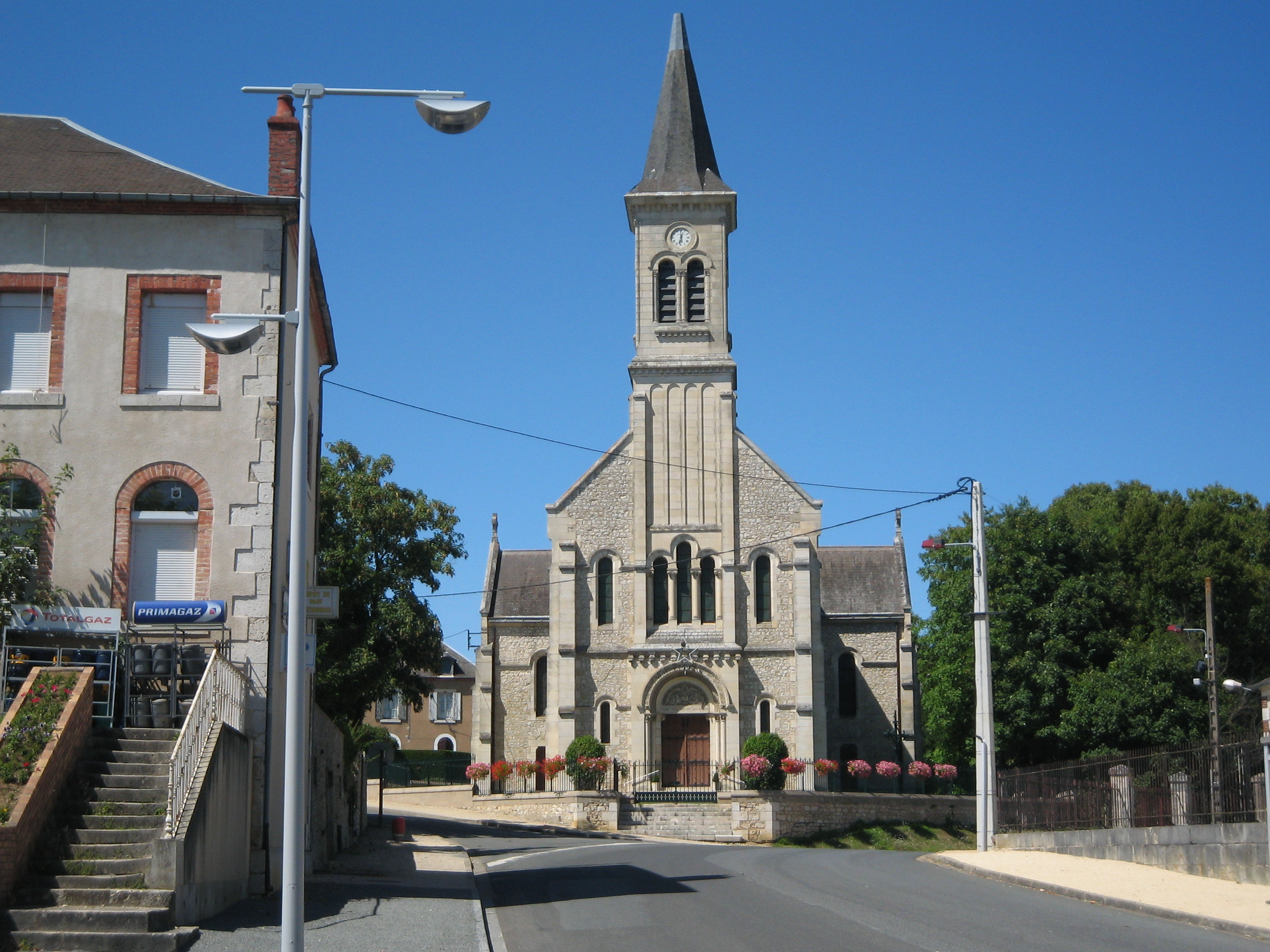
- The church of Saint-Albert, in Lunery
- Location of Lunery
- Location within France Location within Centre-Val de Loire
- Coordinates: 46°56′10″N 2°16′19″E
- Country: France
- Region: Centre-Val de Loire
- Department: Cher
- Arrondissement: Bourges
- Canton: Chârost
- Intercommunality: CC FerCher

Government
  - Mayor (2020–2026): Sylvain Joly
- Area^{1}: 32.87 km^{2} (12.69 sq mi)
- Elevation: 135 m (443 ft)
- Highest elevation: 173 m (568 ft)
- Lowest elevation: 121 m (397 ft)
- Population (2023): 1,486
  - Density: 45.21/km^{2} (117.1/sq mi)
- Time zone: UTC+01:00 (CET)
  - Summer (DST): UTC+02:00 (CEST)
- INSEE/Postal code: 18133 /18400
- ^{1} French Land Register data, which excludes lakes, ponds, glaciers > 1 km^{2} (0.386 sq mi or 247 acres) and river estuaries.

Lunery (French pronunciation: [lynʁi]) is a commune in the Cher department in the Centre-Val de Loire region of France.

== Geography ==
A forestry and farming area comprising two villages and several hamlets situated in the valley of the river Cher, some 12 miles (19 km) southwest of Bourges, at the junction of the D103, D88, D35 and the D27 roads. The commune is served by a TER railway link to Bourges.

== Population ==
Historical population
Year	Pop.	±% p.a.
1968	2,329	—
1975	2,440	+0.67%
1982	2,021	−2.66%
1990	1,665	−2.39%
1999	1,536	−0.89%
2007	1,477	−0.49%
2012	1,467	−0.14%
2017	1,570	+1.37%
2023	1,486	−0.91%
Source: INSEE

== Sights ==
- The church of St. Privé, dating from the thirteenth century.
- The chateau at Champroy.
- The church of St. Albert at Rosières, dating from the nineteenth century.
- The fifteenth-century manorhouse de La Vergne.

== See also ==
- Communes of the Cher department
