= Chouday =

- Commune
- Location of Chouday
- Location within France Location within Centre-Val de Loire
- Coordinates: 46°54′41″N 2°03′57″E
- Country: France
- Region: Centre-Val de Loire
- Department: Indre
- Arrondissement: Issoudun
- Canton: Issoudun

Government
  - Mayor (2020–2026): Carole Branchereau
- Area^{1}: 30 km^{2} (12 sq mi)
- Elevation: 161 m (528 ft)
- Highest elevation: 164 m (538 ft)
- Lowest elevation: 136 m (446 ft)
- Population (2023): 140
  - Density: 4.7/km^{2} (12/sq mi)
- Time zone: UTC+01:00 (CET)
  - Summer (DST): UTC+02:00 (CEST)
- INSEE/Postal code: 36052 /36100
- ^{1} French Land Register data, which excludes lakes, ponds, glaciers > 1 km^{2} (0.386 sq mi or 247 acres) and river estuaries.

Chouday (French pronunciation: [ʃudɛ]) is a commune in the Indre department in central France.

== Population ==
Historical population
Year	Pop.	±% p.a.
1968	191	—
1975	165	−2.07%
1982	137	−2.62%
1990	143	+0.54%
1999	153	+0.75%
2007	165	+0.95%
2012	154	−1.37%
2017	153	−0.13%
2023	140	−1.47%
Source: INSEE

== See also ==
- Communes of the Indre department
