= Primelles =

- Commune
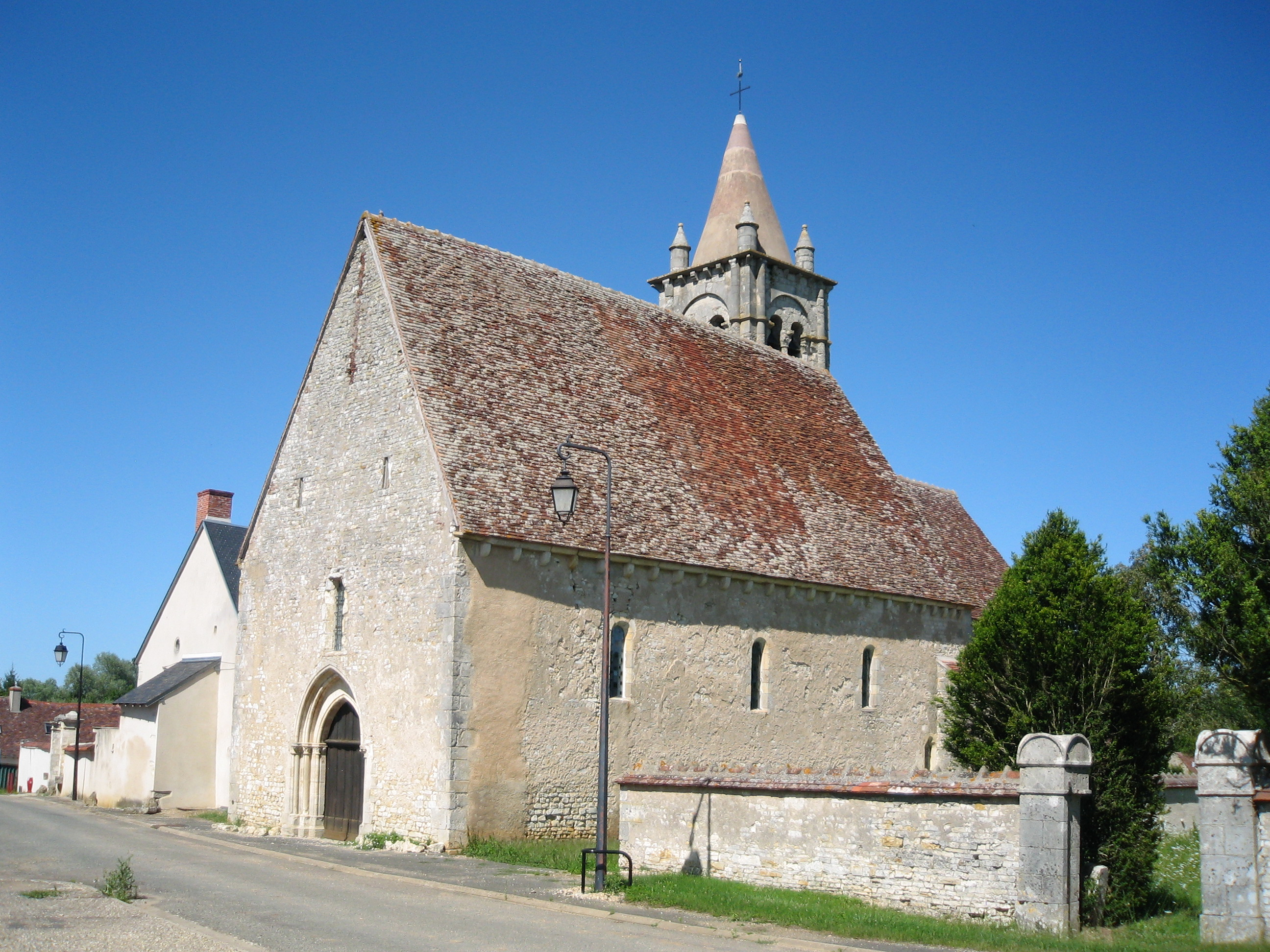
- The church of Saint-Laurent, in Primelles
- Location of Primelles
- Location within France Location within Centre-Val de Loire
- Coordinates: 46°55′45″N 2°12′50″E
- Country: France
- Region: Centre-Val de Loire
- Department: Cher
- Arrondissement: Bourges
- Canton: Chârost
- Intercommunality: CC FerCher

Government
  - Mayor (2020–2026): Michel Bonnet
- Area^{1}: 26.57 km^{2} (10.26 sq mi)
- Elevation: 151 m (495 ft)
- Highest elevation: 173 m (568 ft)
- Lowest elevation: 133 m (436 ft)
- Population (2023): 191
  - Density: 7.19/km^{2} (18.6/sq mi)
- Time zone: UTC+01:00 (CET)
  - Summer (DST): UTC+02:00 (CEST)
- INSEE/Postal code: 18188 /18400
- ^{1} French Land Register data, which excludes lakes, ponds, glaciers > 1 km^{2} (0.386 sq mi or 247 acres) and river estuaries.

Primelles (French pronunciation: [pʁimɛl]) is a commune in the Cher department in the Centre-Val de Loire region of France.

== Geography ==
An area of forestry and farming comprising two villages and a couple of hamlets, situated on the banks of the river Pontet, some 17 miles (27 km) southwest of Bourges, at the junction of the D99 and the D87 roads.

== Population ==
Historical population
Year	Pop.	±% p.a.
1968	336	—
1975	302	−1.51%
1982	264	−1.90%
1990	247	−0.83%
1999	261	+0.61%
2007	262	+0.05%
2012	250	−0.93%
2017	247	−0.24%
2023	191	−4.19%
Source: INSEE

== Sights ==
- The church of St. Laurent, dating from the twelfth century.
- Two feudal mottes.

== See also ==
- Communes of the Cher department
