= Communauté de communes du Pays d'Issoudun =

Federation of municipalities in France

Pays d'Issoudun
- Communauté de communes
- Country: France
- Region: Centre-Val de Loire
- Department: Cher, Indre
- No. of communes: {{{nbcomm}}}
- Established: 1 January 1994

Government
  - President: André Laignel
- Area: 310.7 km^{2} (120.0 sq mi)
- Population (2018): 19,822
  - Density: 63.80/km^{2} (165.2/sq mi)

The communauté de communes du Pays d'Issoudun is located in the Cher and Indre départements of the Centre-Val de Loire region of France. It came into force on 1 January 1994. Its area is 310.7 km^{2}, and its population was 19,822 in 2018.

== Composition ==
The communauté de communes consists of the following 12 communes, of which three (Chârost, Chezal-Benoît and Saint-Ambroix) in the Cher department:

List of communes of the Communauté de communes du Pays d'Issoudun
Name	INSEE code	Demonym	Area (km^{2})	Population (2019)	Density (per km^{2})
Issoudun (seat)	36088	Issoldunois	36.6	11,477	314
Les Bordes	36021	Bordais	16.3	891	55
Chârost	18055	Chârostais	10.97	941	86
Chezal-Benoît	18065	Casalais	46.46	823	18
Diou	36065	Divins	16.39	260	16
Migny	36125		13.35	120	9
Paudy	36152		30.28	440	15
Reuilly	36171	Reuillois	25.8	2,010	78
Saint-Ambroix	18198	Saint-Ambroisiens	31.22	371	12
Saint-Georges-sur-Arnon	36195	Georgiens	23.87	571	24
Sainte-Lizaigne	36199	Lizigniens	26.36	1,145	43
Ségry	36215	Ségriens	33.06	496	15

== Administration ==
=== Seat ===
The seat of the communauté de communes is in Issoudun, on Place des Droits de l'Homme.

=== Elected members ===
The communauté de communes is directed by a community council composed of members representing each of the member communes and elected for a term of six years.

They are distributed as follows:

Number of delegates	Commune(s)
1	Les Bordes · Chârost · Chezal-Benoît · Diou · Migny · Paudy · Saint-Ambroix · Saint-Georges-sur-Arnon · Sainte-Lizaigne · Ségry
3	Reuilly
13	Issoudun

=== Presidency ===
List of successive presidents of the Communauté de communes du Pays d'Issoudun
In office		Name	Party	Capacity	Ref.
20 December 1993	Incumbent	André Laignel	PS	Mayor of Issoudun	
