= Saint-Caprais, Cher =

Saint-Caprais
- Commune
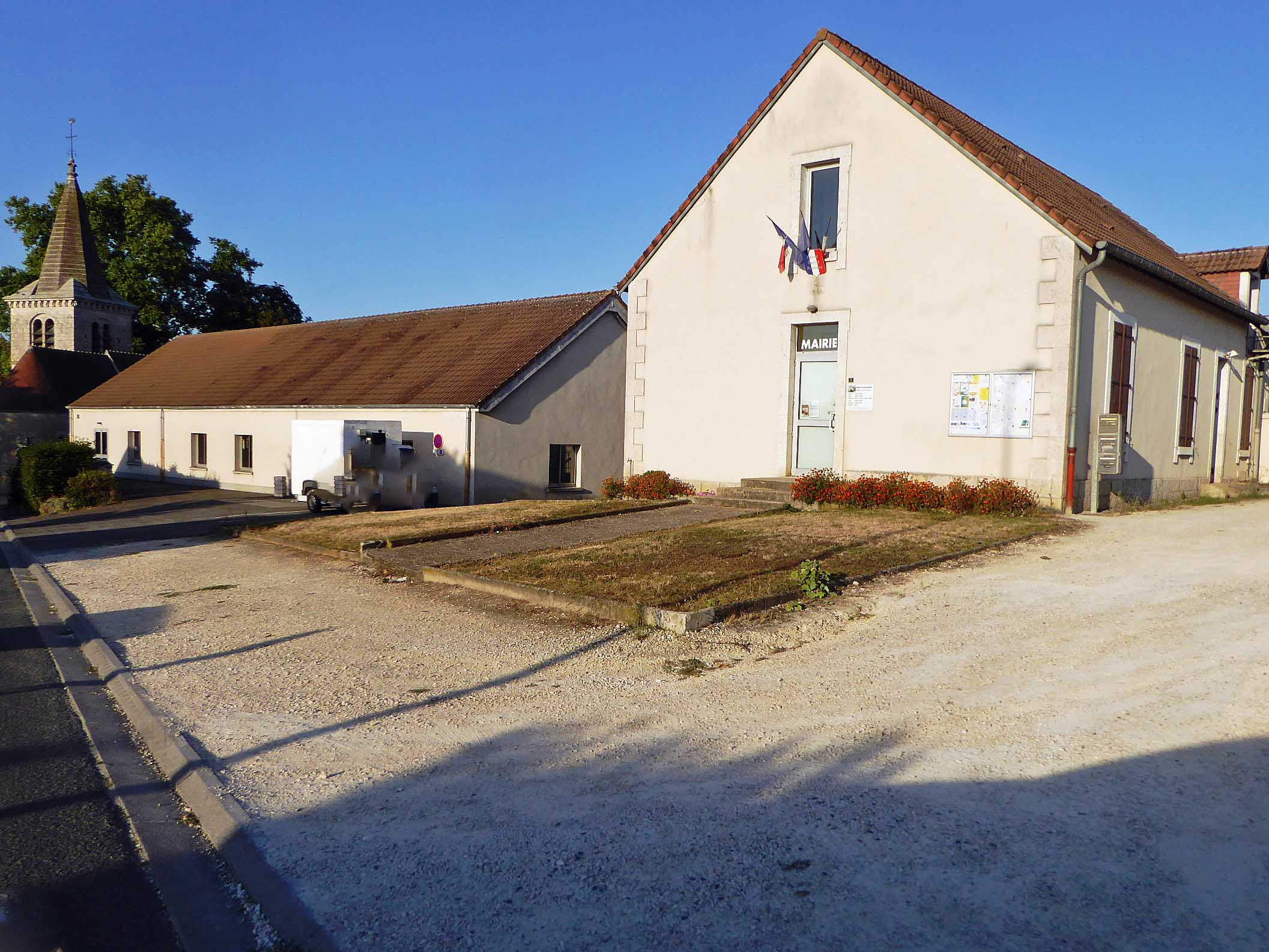
- Saint-Caprais Town hall
- Location of Saint-Caprais
- Location within France Location within Centre-Val de Loire
- Coordinates: 46°58′10″N 2°17′39″E
- Country: France
- Region: Centre-Val de Loire
- Department: Cher
- Arrondissement: Bourges
- Canton: Trouy
- Intercommunality: CC FerCher

Government
  - Mayor (2020–2026): Antonietta Santosuosso
- Area^{1}: 14.42 km^{2} (5.57 sq mi)
- Elevation: 160 m (520 ft)
- Highest elevation: 171 m (561 ft)
- Lowest elevation: 122 m (400 ft)
- Population (2023): 747
  - Density: 51.8/km^{2} (134/sq mi)
- Time zone: UTC+01:00 (CET)
  - Summer (DST): UTC+02:00 (CEST)
- INSEE/Postal code: 18201 /18400
- ^{1} French Land Register data, which excludes lakes, ponds, glaciers > 1 km^{2} (0.386 sq mi or 247 acres) and river estuaries.

Saint-Caprais (French pronunciation: [sɛ̃ kapʁɛ]) is a commune in the Cher department in central France.

== Population ==
Historical population
Year	Pop.	±% p.a.
1968	299	—
1975	271	−1.39%
1982	317	+2.27%
1990	449	+4.45%
1999	491	+1.00%
2007	595	+2.43%
2012	742	+4.51%
2017	767	+0.66%
2023	747	−0.44%
Source: INSEE

== See also ==
- Communes of the Cher department
