= Migny =

- Commune
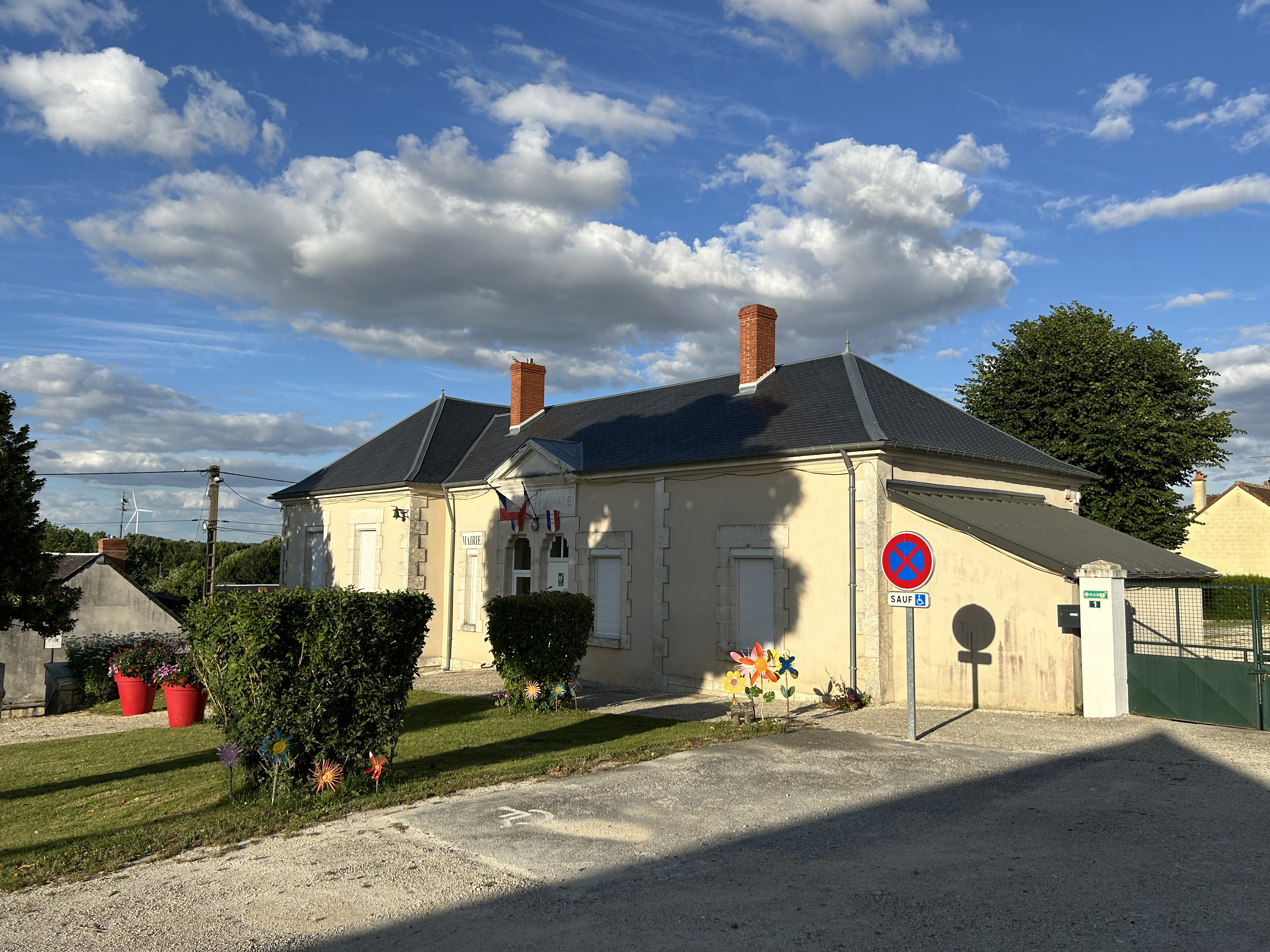
- Migny Town hall
- Location of Migny
- Location within France Location within Centre-Val de Loire
- Coordinates: 47°01′33″N 2°04′02″E
- Country: France
- Region: Centre-Val de Loire
- Department: Indre
- Arrondissement: Issoudun
- Canton: Issoudun
- Intercommunality: CC Pays d'Issoudun

Government
  - Mayor (2020–2026): Alexandra Darinot
- Area^{1}: 13.35 km^{2} (5.15 sq mi)
- Elevation: 123 m (404 ft)
- Highest elevation: 153 m (502 ft)
- Lowest elevation: 112 m (367 ft)
- Population (2023): 108
  - Density: 8.09/km^{2} (21.0/sq mi)
- Time zone: UTC+01:00 (CET)
  - Summer (DST): UTC+02:00 (CEST)
- INSEE/Postal code: 36125 /36260
- ^{1} French Land Register data, which excludes lakes, ponds, glaciers > 1 km^{2} (0.386 sq mi or 247 acres) and river estuaries.

Migny (French pronunciation: [miɲi]) is a commune in the Indre department in central France.

== Population ==
Historical population
Year	Pop.	±% p.a.
1968	94	—
1975	64	−5.34%
1982	86	+4.31%
1990	78	−1.21%
1999	99	+2.68%
2007	120	+2.43%
2012	122	+0.33%
2017	129	+1.12%
2023	108	−2.92%
Source: INSEE

== See also ==
- Communes of the Indre department
