= Plou, Cher =

Plou
- Commune
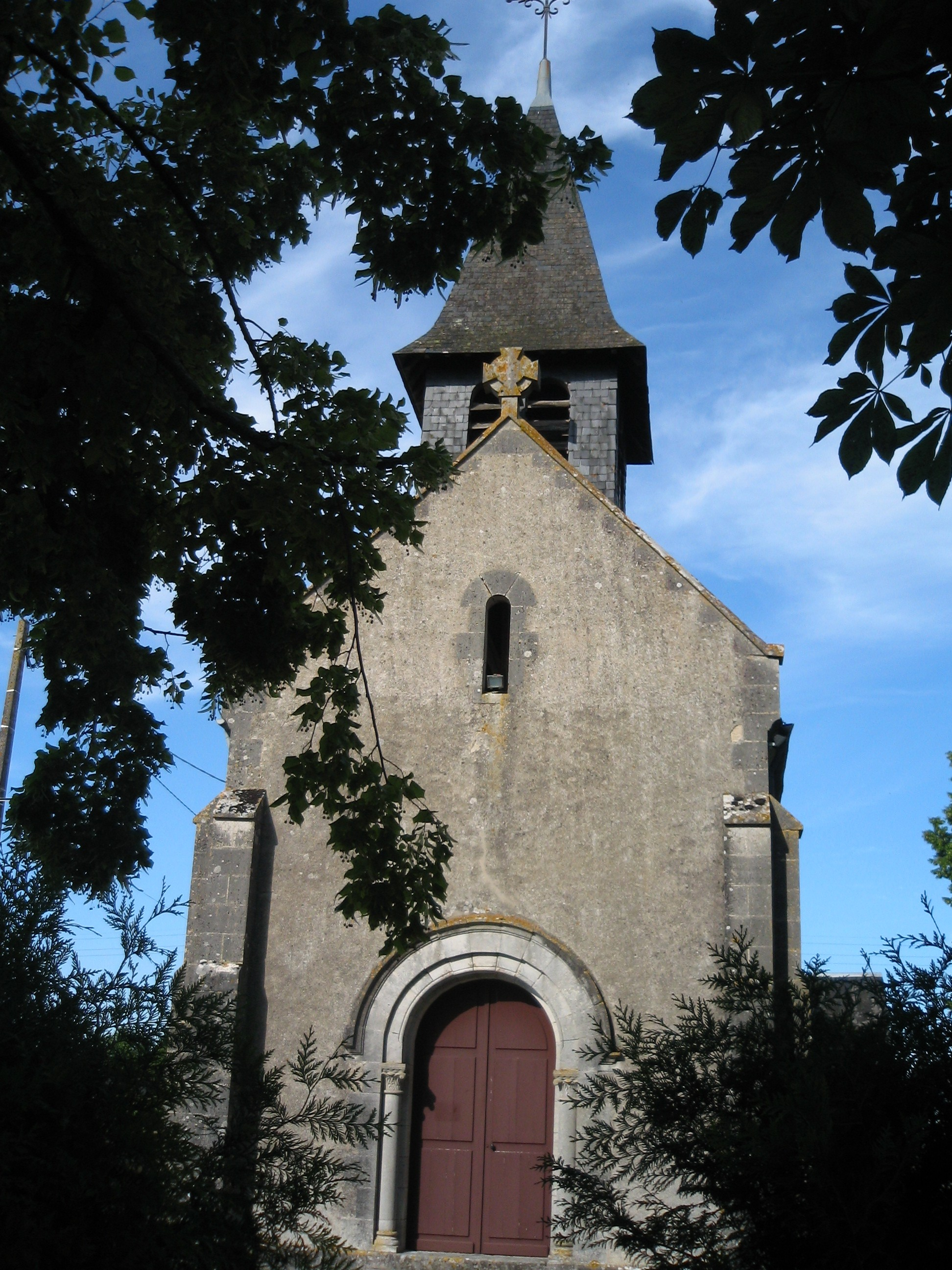
- The church in Plou
- Location of Plou
- Location within France Location within Centre-Val de Loire
- Coordinates: 47°00′55″N 2°09′20″E
- Country: France
- Region: Centre-Val de Loire
- Department: Cher
- Arrondissement: Bourges
- Canton: Chârost
- Intercommunality: CC FerCher

Government
  - Mayor (2020–2026): Fabrice Chabance
- Area^{1}: 33.21 km^{2} (12.82 sq mi)
- Elevation: 152 m (499 ft)
- Highest elevation: 161 m (528 ft)
- Lowest elevation: 122 m (400 ft)
- Population (2023): 527
  - Density: 15.9/km^{2} (41.1/sq mi)
- Time zone: UTC+01:00 (CET)
  - Summer (DST): UTC+02:00 (CEST)
- INSEE/Postal code: 18181 /18290
- ^{1} French Land Register data, which excludes lakes, ponds, glaciers > 1 km^{2} (0.386 sq mi or 247 acres) and river estuaries.

Plou (French pronunciation: [plu]) is a commune in the Cher département in the Centre-Val de Loire region of France about 13 miles (21 km) southwest of Bourges.

== Population ==
Historical population
Year	Pop.	±% p.a.
1968	421	—
1975	469	+1.55%
1982	410	−1.90%
1990	436	+0.77%
1999	436	+0.00%
2007	458	+0.62%
2012	520	+2.57%
2017	529	+0.34%
2023	527	−0.06%
Source: INSEE

== Notable people ==
- Louis Béchereau (1880–1970), aeronautical engineer
- Théophile Marion Dumersan (1780–1849), writer and numismatist
