= Canton of Chârost =

Coordinates: 46°59′37″N 2°7′1″E

Chârost
- Canton
- Interactive map of Chârost
- Country: France
- Region: Centre-Val de Loire
- Department: Cher
- No. of communes: {{{nbcomm}}}
- Area: 304.89 km^{2} (117.72 sq mi)
- Population (2023): 13,849
  - Density: 45.423/km^{2} (117.64/sq mi)
- INSEE code: 18 07

The Canton of Chârost is a canton situated in the Cher département and in the Centre-Val de Loire region of France. It has 14,092 inhabitants (2018, without double counting).

== Geography ==
A farming and forestry area in the valley of the Arnon, in the western part of the arrondissement of Bourges and centred on the town of Chârost. The altitude varies from 113m at Poisieux to 173m at Lunery, with an average altitude of 149m.

The canton comprises the following 13 communes:

- Chârost
- Civray
- Lunery
- Mareuil-sur-Arnon
- Morthomiers
- Plou
- Poisieux
- Primelles
- Saint-Ambroix
- Saint-Florent-sur-Cher
- Saugy
- Le Subdray
- Villeneuve-sur-Cher

== Population ==
Historical population
Year	Pop.	±% p.a.
2013	14,338	—
2018	14,092	−0.35%
Source: INSEE

== See also ==
- Arrondissements of the Cher department
- Cantons of the Cher department
- Communes of the Cher department
