= Ségry =

- Commune
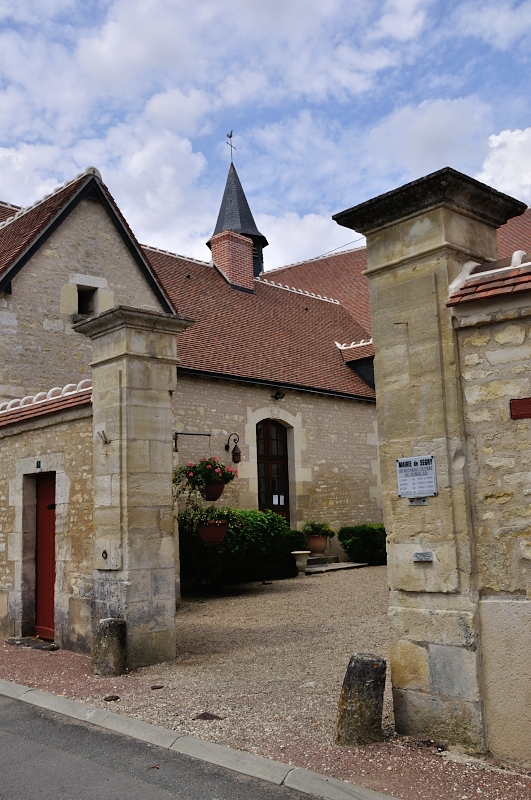
- The town hall in Ségry
- Location of Ségry
- Location within France Location within Centre-Val de Loire
- Coordinates: 46°53′29″N 2°05′00″E
- Country: France
- Region: Centre-Val de Loire
- Department: Indre
- Arrondissement: Issoudun
- Canton: Issoudun
- Intercommunality: CC Pays d'Issoudun

Government
  - Mayor (2020–2026): Stéphane Gourier
- Area^{1}: 33.06 km^{2} (12.76 sq mi)
- Elevation: 150 m (490 ft)
- Highest elevation: 176 m (577 ft)
- Lowest elevation: 130 m (430 ft)
- Population (2023): 484
  - Density: 14.6/km^{2} (37.9/sq mi)
- Time zone: UTC+01:00 (CET)
  - Summer (DST): UTC+02:00 (CEST)
- INSEE/Postal code: 36215 /36100
- ^{1} French Land Register data, which excludes lakes, ponds, glaciers > 1 km^{2} (0.386 sq mi or 247 acres) and river estuaries.

Ségry (French pronunciation: [seɡʁi]) is a commune in the Indre department in central France.

== Population ==
Historical population
Year	Pop.	±% p.a.
1968	364	—
1975	321	−1.78%
1982	312	−0.41%
1990	442	+4.45%
1999	465	+0.57%
2007	504	+1.01%
2012	530	+1.01%
2017	504	−1.00%
2023	484	−0.67%
Source: INSEE

== See also ==
- Communes of the Indre department
