= Communauté de communes FerCher =

Federation of municipalities in Centre-Val de Loire, France

FerCher
- Communauté de communes
- Country: France
- Region: Centre-Val de Loire
- Department: Cher
- No. of communes: {{{nbcomm}}}
- Established: 2001

Government
  - President: Fabrice Chabance
- Area: 232.0 km^{2} (89.6 sq mi)
- Population (2018): 11,527
  - Density: 49.69/km^{2} (128.7/sq mi)

The communauté de communes FerCher (before 2021: FerCher - Pays florentais) is located in the Cher département of the Centre-Val de Loire region of France. It was created on 1 January 2001 and its seat is the town Saint-Florent-sur-Cher. Its area is 232.0 km^{2}, and its population was 11,527 in 2018.

== Composition ==
The communauté de communes consists of the following 9 communes:

1. Civray
2. Lunery
3. Mareuil-sur-Arnon
4. Plou
5. Primelles
6. Saint-Caprais
7. Saint-Florent-sur-Cher
8. Saugy
9. Villeneuve-sur-Cher
