= Stade Yves-du-Manoir =

Stadium in Colombes, France

Coordinates: 48°55′46″N 2°14′53″E

- Colombes
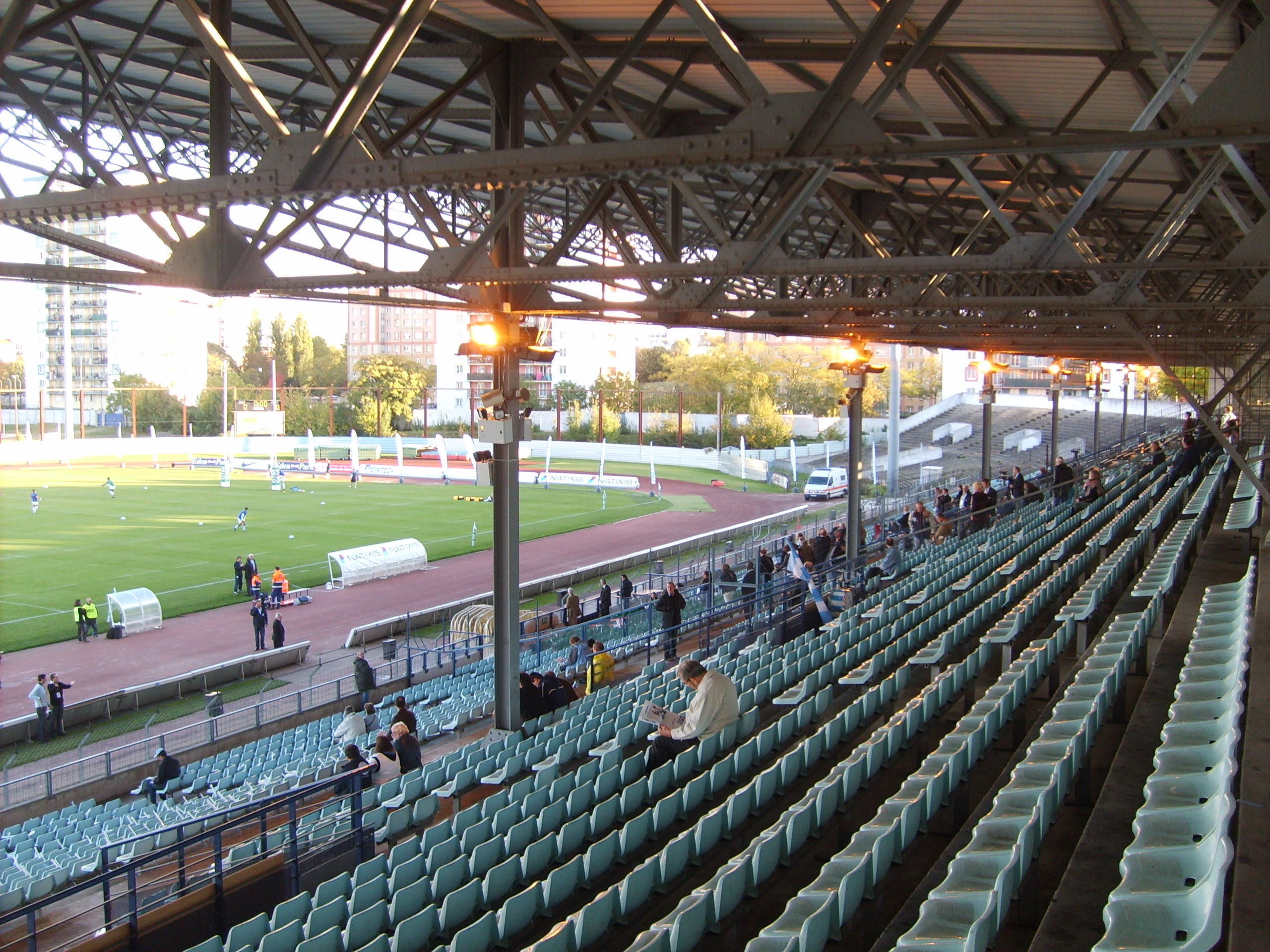
- Interactive map of Stade Yves-du-Manoir
- Full name: Stade olympique Yves-du-Manoir
- Former names: Stade du Matin (1907–1919); Stade olympique de Colombes (1920–1927)
- Location: Colombes, France
- Capacity: 15,000 Formerly List: 45,000 (1924); 60,000 (1938); 50,000 (1971); 7,000 (1990s); 14,000 (2010s)
- Surface: Grass

Construction
- Opened: 1907
- Renovated: 2017, 2022–24
- Expanded: 2022–24

Tenants
- Racing Club de France Football (1907–1985, 2012–present); Racing 92 (1907–2017)

Website
- paris2024.org

The Stade Yves-du-Manoir (officially Stade olympique Yves-du-Manoir, also known as the Stade olympique de Colombes, or simply Colombes to the locals) is a rugby, track, and association football stadium in Colombes, near Paris, France.

== History ==
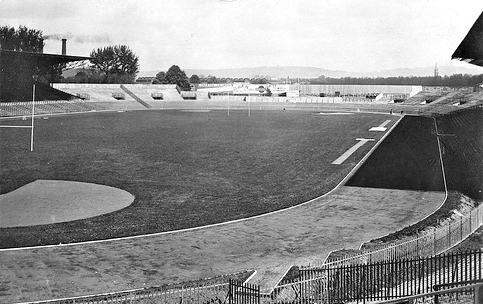
The stadium after being renovated for the 1924 Summer Olympics.

Named in memory of French rugby player Yves du Manoir in 1928, it was the main stadium for the 1924 Summer Olympics and had a capacity of 45,000 at the time. During the 1924 Games, it hosted the athletics, gymnastics and tennis events, as well as some of the cycling, horse riding, football, and rugby events, and two of the modern pentathlon events (running, fencing).

It was later expanded to a capacity of over 60,000. Colombes was also the venue for the 1938 World Cup Final between Italy and Hungary, and also hosted the home team's two matches in the tournament.

Colombes hosted several French Cup finals and home games of the national football and national rugby union teams into the 1970s. It remained the nation's largest capacity stadium until the renovated Parc des Princes was inaugurated in 1972. Due to increasingly stringent safety regulations, the Colombes' capacity had dropped to under 50,000. The last games of the national rugby union and football teams at Colombes were respectively in 1972 and 1975.

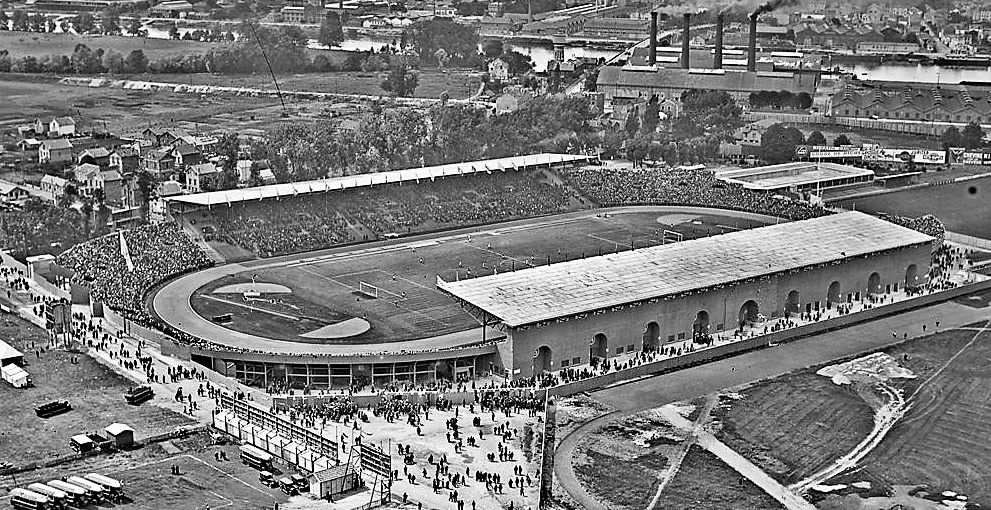
Colombes during the football final of the 1924 Olympics.

France's professional football team RC Paris used Colombes as their home ground until about 1985, then moved on to other stadia before returning in the 2010s. Unlike RC Paris, Racing 92 rugby did not leave Colombes until November 2017. They originally planned to redevelop Yves-du-Manoir into a stadium to be shared with Racing Club de France Football. Instead, they built Plenitude Arena in nearby Nanterre, playing their first match in the new venue in December 2017. It remains to be seen whether the Racing Club de France football club will move as well.

It was closed and redeveloped between 2022–24 and served as the field hockey venue for the 2024 Summer Olympics.

== 1938 FIFA World Cup ==
Stade Olympique Yves-du-Manoir hosted three games of the 1938 FIFA World Cup, including the final.

Date	Time	Team #1	Res.	Team #2	Round	Attendance
5 June 1938	17:00	France	3–1	Belgium	Round of 16	30,454
12 June 1938	17:00	France	1–3	Italy	Quarter-final	58,455
19 June 1938	17:00	Italy	4–2	Hungary	Final	45,000

== 2024 Summer Olympics ==
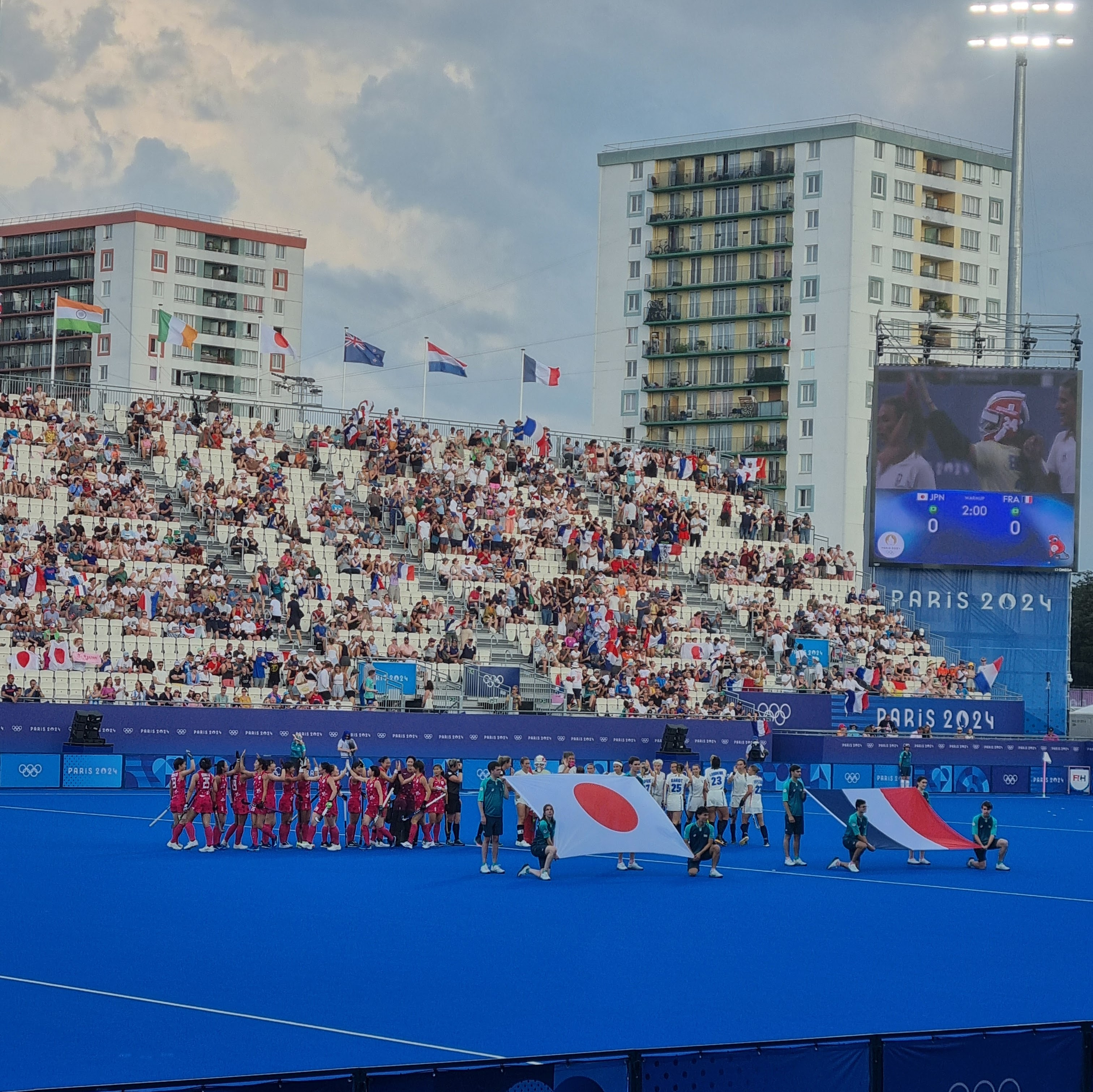
Host nation France preparing for their match against Japan in the 2024 Summer Olympics women's field hockey tournament

The site has been completely renovated between 2021 and 2023. Designed by the architectural firm Celnikier et Grabli Architectes and rebuilt by the construction group Léon Grosse, the work was completed in December 2023. The new complex will house the French Field Hockey Federation and its national training center, which will have the two floodlit synthetic pitches from the Olympic tournament, one of which has a 1,000-seat stand around a building constructed with administrative premises, meeting rooms and changing rooms.

The complex also includes seven new football and rugby union pitches. The legendary main pitch sees its famous Olympic athletics track surrounding it removed in favor of a small 200 m ring (only suitable for warming up) located a few hundred metres away. The track therefore now excludes any possibility of athletics competition, being now reserved for schools and associations.

However, its historic grandstand has been upgraded with new seats. It can now accommodate 6,000 spectators. The historic stadium has approximately 9,500 seats with the temporary grandstands installed for the 2024 Olympic Games. The natural grass pitch is being replaced by a brand new blue synthetic pitch.

The entire sports complex can accommodate around 13,500 spectators during the 2024 Summer Olympics.

The total cost of the project is 101 million euros; this budget was financed by the Hauts-de-Seine department and the Olympic Works Delivery Company (Solidéo).

In addition to the installation of the French Field Hockey Federation and its national training centre, it is planned that the field hockey section of Racing Club de France and the football section, Racing Club de France Football, will eventually become the resident clubs of the stadium and that Racing 92 may play a few rugby union matches and train there.

== In popular culture ==
The Olympic races involving Harold Abrahams and Eric Liddell, which are portrayed in the film Chariots of Fire, were run here, although the Colombes stadium was not used for the film. The stand-in stadium for filming was the Oval Sports Centre, Bebington, Merseyside, near Liverpool, England.

The stadium was portrayed in the 1981 film Escape to Victory starring Sylvester Stallone and Michael Caine, but the stand-stadium used in the filming was the Hidegkuti Nándor Stadion (1947) in Budapest, Hungary.

Preceded by Olympisch Stadion; Antwerp	Summer Olympics; Main Venue (Stade de Colombes); 1924	Succeeded by Olympisch Stadion; Amsterdam
Preceded by Olympisch Stadion; Antwerp	Summer Olympics; Athletics competitions Main Venue; 1924	Succeeded by Olympisch Stadion; Amsterdam
Preceded by Olympisch Stadion; Antwerp	Summer Olympics; Football Men's Finals (Stade de Colombes); 1924	Succeeded by Olympisch Stadion; Amsterdam
Preceded by Stadio del PNF; Rome	FIFA World Cup; Final Venue; 1938	Succeeded by Estádio do Maracanã; Rio de Janeiro
Preceded by Oi Hockey Stadium; Tokyo	Summer Olympics; Hockey competitions 2024	Succeeded by Dignity Health Sports Park; Los Angeles
