= Le Subdray =

- Commune
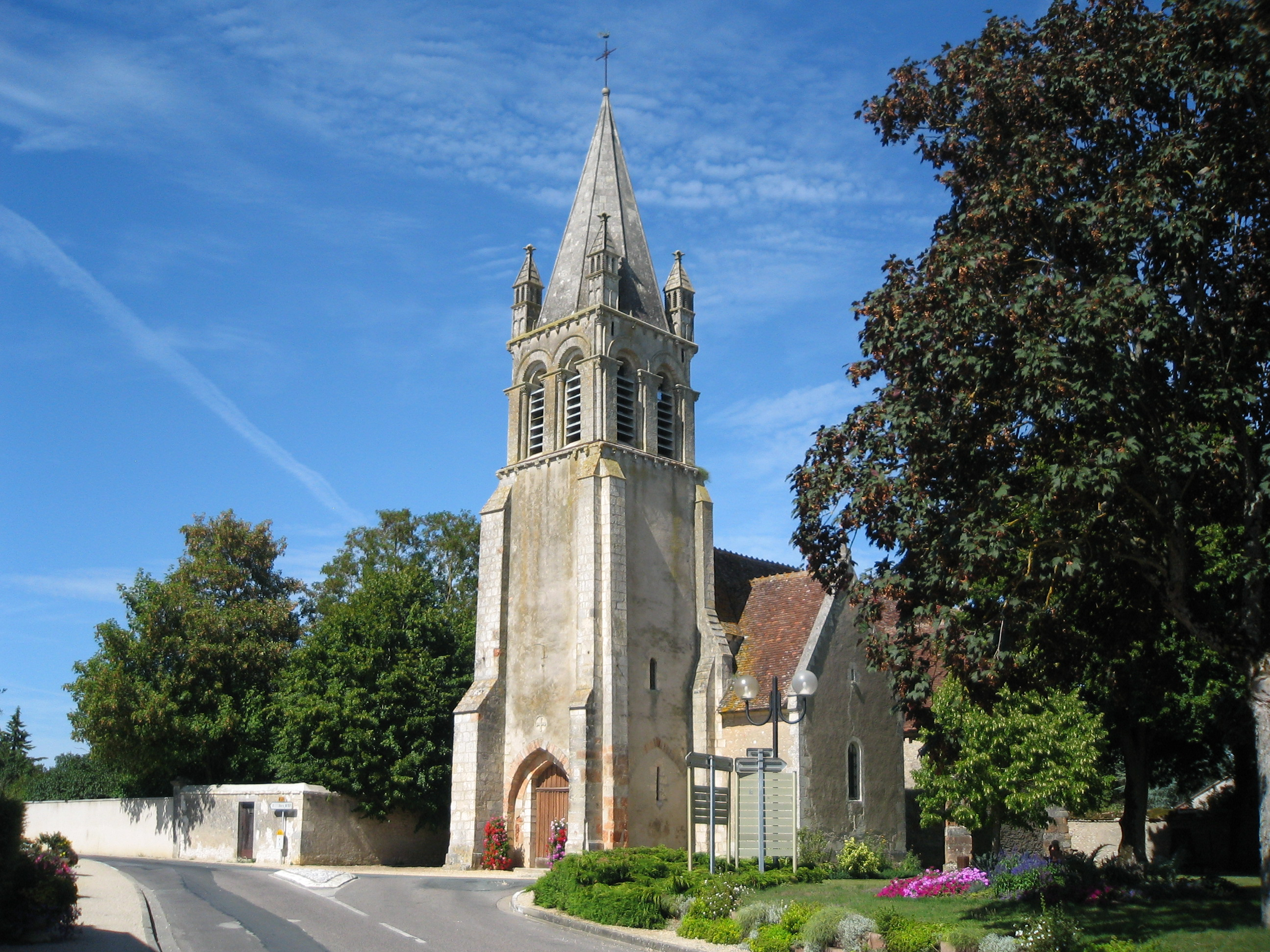
- The church of Our Lady, in Le Subdray
- Location of Le Subdray
- Location within France Location within Centre-Val de Loire
- Coordinates: 47°00′41″N 2°17′43″E
- Country: France
- Region: Centre-Val de Loire
- Department: Cher
- Arrondissement: Bourges
- Canton: Chârost
- Intercommunality: CA Bourges Plus

Government
  - Mayor (2020–2026): Bruno Fouchet
- Area^{1}: 20.28 km^{2} (7.83 sq mi)
- Highest elevation: 169 m (554 ft)
- Lowest elevation: 137 m (449 ft)
- Population (2023): 967
  - Density: 47.7/km^{2} (123/sq mi)
- Time zone: UTC+01:00 (CET)
  - Summer (DST): UTC+02:00 (CEST)
- INSEE/Postal code: 18255 /18570
- ^{1} French Land Register data, which excludes lakes, ponds, glaciers > 1 km^{2} (0.386 sq mi or 247 acres) and river estuaries.

Le Subdray (French pronunciation: [lə sybdʁɛ]) is a commune in the Cher department in the Centre-Val de Loire region of France.

== Geography ==
An area of farming and a little light industry, comprising the village and a couple of hamlets situated about 9 miles (14 km) southwest of Bourges at the junction of the N151 with the D31 and the D103 and with the D107 road.

== Population ==
Historical population
Year	Pop.	±% p.a.
1968	355	—
1975	425	+2.60%
1982	431	+0.20%
1990	478	+1.30%
1999	712	+4.53%
2007	826	+1.87%
2012	993	+3.75%
2017	932	−1.26%
2023	967	+0.62%
Source: INSEE

== Sights ==
- The church of Notre-Dame, dating from the fourteenth century.

== See also ==
- Communes of the Cher department
