= Chezal-Benoît =

- Commune
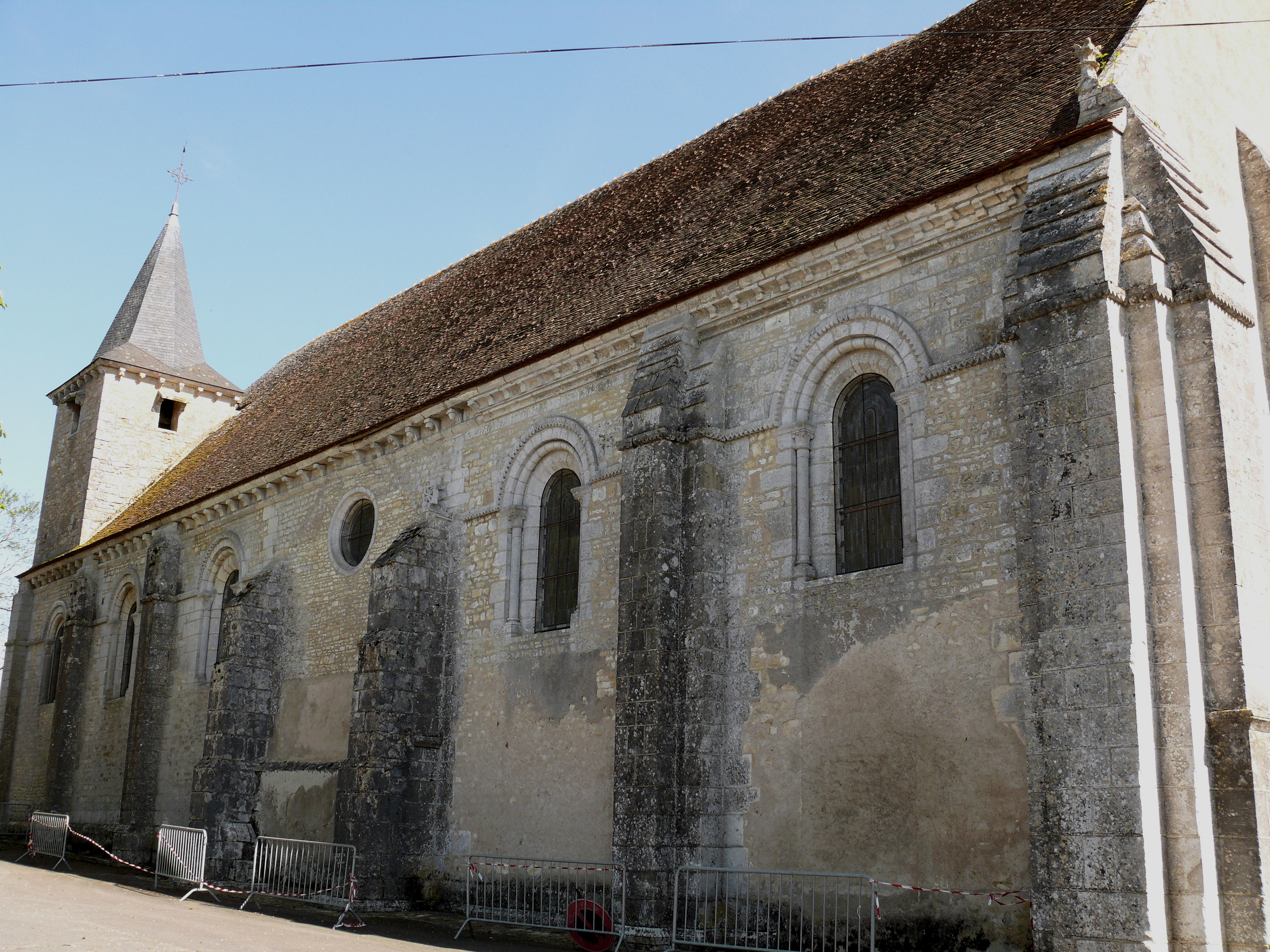
- The church in Chezal-Benoît
- Location of Chezal-Benoît
- Location within France Location within Centre-Val de Loire
- Coordinates: 46°49′40″N 2°06′54″E
- Country: France
- Region: Centre-Val de Loire
- Department: Cher
- Arrondissement: Saint-Amand-Montrond
- Canton: Châteaumeillant
- Intercommunality: Pays d'Issoudun

Government
  - Mayor (2020–2026): Roger Lebrero
- Area^{1}: 46.46 km^{2} (17.94 sq mi)
- Elevation: 173 m (568 ft)
- Highest elevation: 187 m (614 ft)
- Lowest elevation: 137 m (449 ft)
- Population (2023): 765
  - Density: 16.5/km^{2} (42.6/sq mi)
- Time zone: UTC+01:00 (CET)
  - Summer (DST): UTC+02:00 (CEST)
- INSEE/Postal code: 18065 /18160
- ^{1} French Land Register data, which excludes lakes, ponds, glaciers > 1 km^{2} (0.386 sq mi or 247 acres) and river estuaries.

Chezal-Benoît (French pronunciation: [ʃəzal bənwa]) is a commune in the Cher department in the Centre-Val de Loire region of France.

== Geography ==
An area of lakes and streams, farming and forestry comprising a village and a couple of hamlets situated in the valley of the small river Mouzet, some 23 miles (37 km) southwest of Bourges at the junction of the D18 with the D65 and the D115 roads. The commune shares its western border with the department of Indre.

== Population ==
Historical population
| Year | Pop. | ±% p.a. |
|---|---|---|
| 1968 | 1,526 | — |
| 1975 | 1,447 | −0.76% |
| 1982 | 1,315 | −1.36% |
| 1990 | 1,212 | −1.01% |
| 1999 | 977 | −2.37% |
| 2007 | 854 | −1.67% |
| 2012 | 938 | +1.89% |
| 2017 | 829 | −2.44% |
| 2023 | 765 | −1.33% |
Source: INSEE

== Sights ==
- The abbey church of St.Pierre, dating from the twelfth century.
- A windmill.
- Other buildings from the Benedictine abbey.

== See also ==
- Communes of the Cher department
