= Saint-Ambroix, Cher =

Saint-Ambroix
- Commune
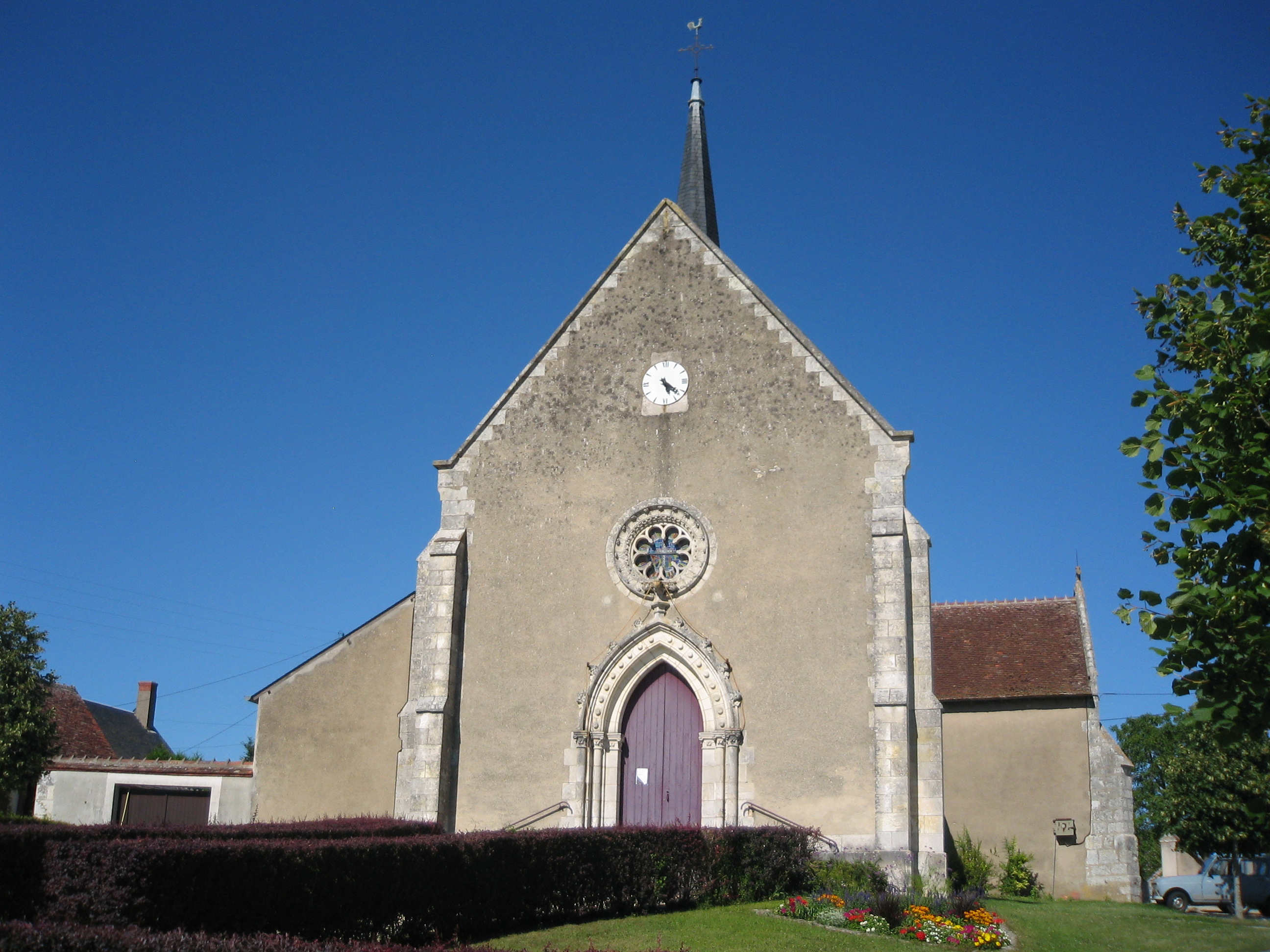
- The church in Saint-Ambroix

- Coat of arms
- Location of Saint-Ambroix
- Location within France Location within Centre-Val de Loire
- Coordinates: 46°55′57″N 2°07′16″E
- Country: France
- Region: Centre-Val de Loire
- Department: Cher
- Arrondissement: Bourges
- Canton: Chârost
- Intercommunality: Pays d'Issoudun

Government
  - Mayor (2020–2026): Johann Trumeau
- Area^{1}: 31.22 km^{2} (12.05 sq mi)
- Elevation: 155 m (509 ft)
- Highest elevation: 166 m (545 ft)
- Lowest elevation: 125 m (410 ft)
- Population (2023): 374
  - Density: 12.0/km^{2} (31.0/sq mi)
- Time zone: UTC+01:00 (CET)
  - Summer (DST): UTC+02:00 (CEST)
- INSEE/Postal code: 18198 /18290
- ^{1} French Land Register data, which excludes lakes, ponds, glaciers > 1 km^{2} (0.386 sq mi or 247 acres) and river estuaries.

Saint-Ambroix (French pronunciation: [sɛ̃.t‿ɑ̃bʁwa]) is a commune in the Cher department in the Centre-Val de Loire region of France.

== Geography ==
A farming area comprising the village and two hamlets situated by the banks of the river Arnon, some 17 miles (27 km) southwest of Bourges, at the junction of the D18, D84 and the D99e roads. The commune borders the department of Indre.

== Population ==
Historical population
Year	Pop.	±% p.a.
1968	496	—
1975	409	−2.72%
1982	406	−0.11%
1990	386	−0.63%
1999	374	−0.35%
2007	388	+0.46%
2012	409	+1.06%
2017	364	−2.30%
2023	374	+0.45%
Source: INSEE

== Sights ==
- The church, dating from the twelfth century.
- A fifteenth-century manorhouse.
- Considerable Roman remains: a graveyard and artefacts.
- The remains of the priory of Semur.

== See also ==
- Communes of the Cher department
