= Canton of Issoudun =

Coordinates: 46.95°N 1.99°E

The canton of Issoudun is an administrative division of the Indre department, central France. It was created at the French canton reorganisation which came into effect in March 2015. Its seat is in Issoudun.

It consists of the following communes:

1. Les Bordes
2. Chouday
3. Issoudun
4. Migny
5. Saint-Georges-sur-Arnon
6. Ségry
