= Chârost =

- Commune
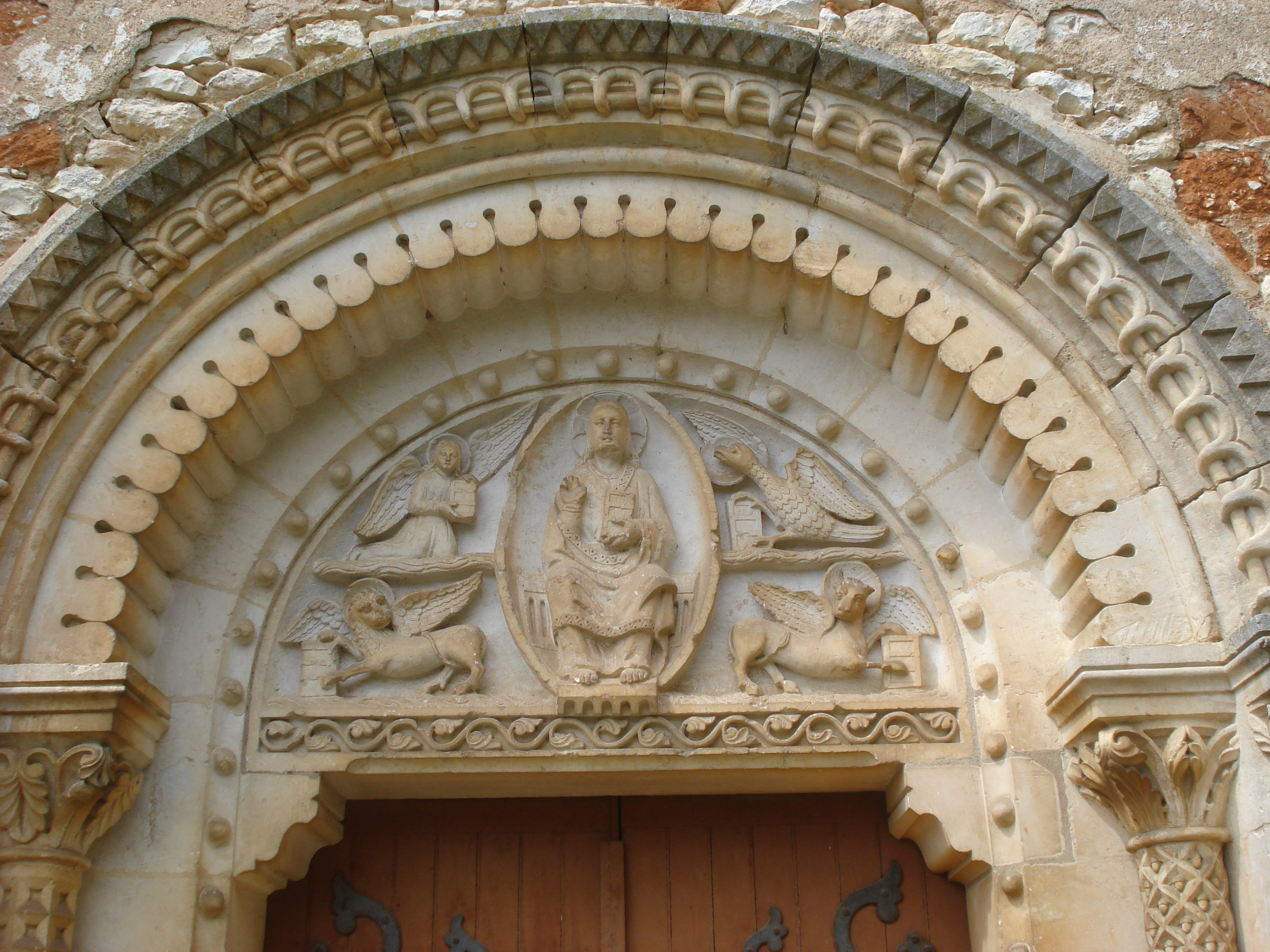
- The tympan of the church

- Coat of arms
- Location of Chârost
- Location within France Location within Centre-Val de Loire
- Coordinates: 46°59′37″N 2°07′01″E
- Country: France
- Region: Centre-Val de Loire
- Department: Cher
- Arrondissement: Bourges
- Canton: Chârost
- Intercommunality: Pays d'Issoudun

Government
  - Mayor (2020–2026): Ludo Coste
- Area^{1}: 10.97 km^{2} (4.24 sq mi)
- Highest elevation: 162 m (531 ft)
- Lowest elevation: 119 m (390 ft)
- Population (2023): 888
  - Density: 80.9/km^{2} (210/sq mi)
- Time zone: UTC+01:00 (CET)
  - Summer (DST): UTC+02:00 (CEST)
- INSEE/Postal code: 18055 /18290
- ^{1} French Land Register data, which excludes lakes, ponds, glaciers > 1 km^{2} (0.386 sq mi or 247 acres) and river estuaries.

Chârost (French pronunciation: [ʃaʁo]) is a commune in the Cher department in the Centre-Val de Loire region of France.

== Geography ==
A farming village situated by the banks of the river Arnon, some 15 miles (24 km) southwest of Bourges at the junction of the N151 with the D16, D88, D18 and D2 roads. The commune lies on the pilgrimage route known as St. James' Way.

== Population ==
Historical population
Year	Pop.	±% p.a.
1968	1,131	—
1975	1,166	+0.44%
1982	1,152	−0.17%
1990	1,134	−0.20%
1999	1,069	−0.65%
2007	985	−1.02%
2012	1,041	+1.11%
2017	980	−1.20%
2023	888	−1.63%
Source: INSEE

== Sights ==
- The church of St. Michel, dating from the nineteenth century.
- The fifteenth-century chateau.
- Wayside stone crosses.
- Traces of an eleventh-century castle donjon.

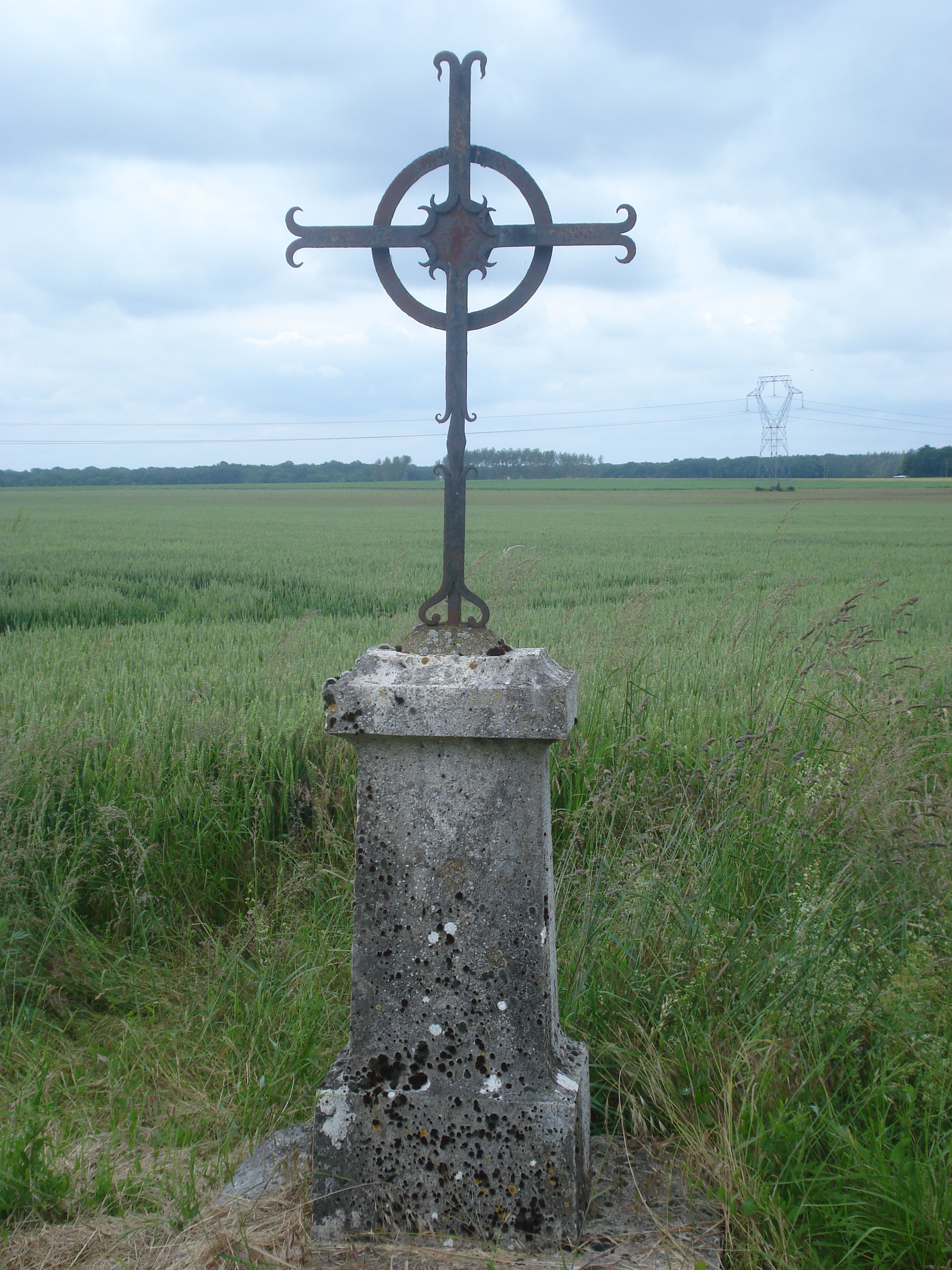
Cross on the pilgrim route

== See also ==
- Communes of the Cher department
