= Reuilly, Indre =

Reuilly
- Commune
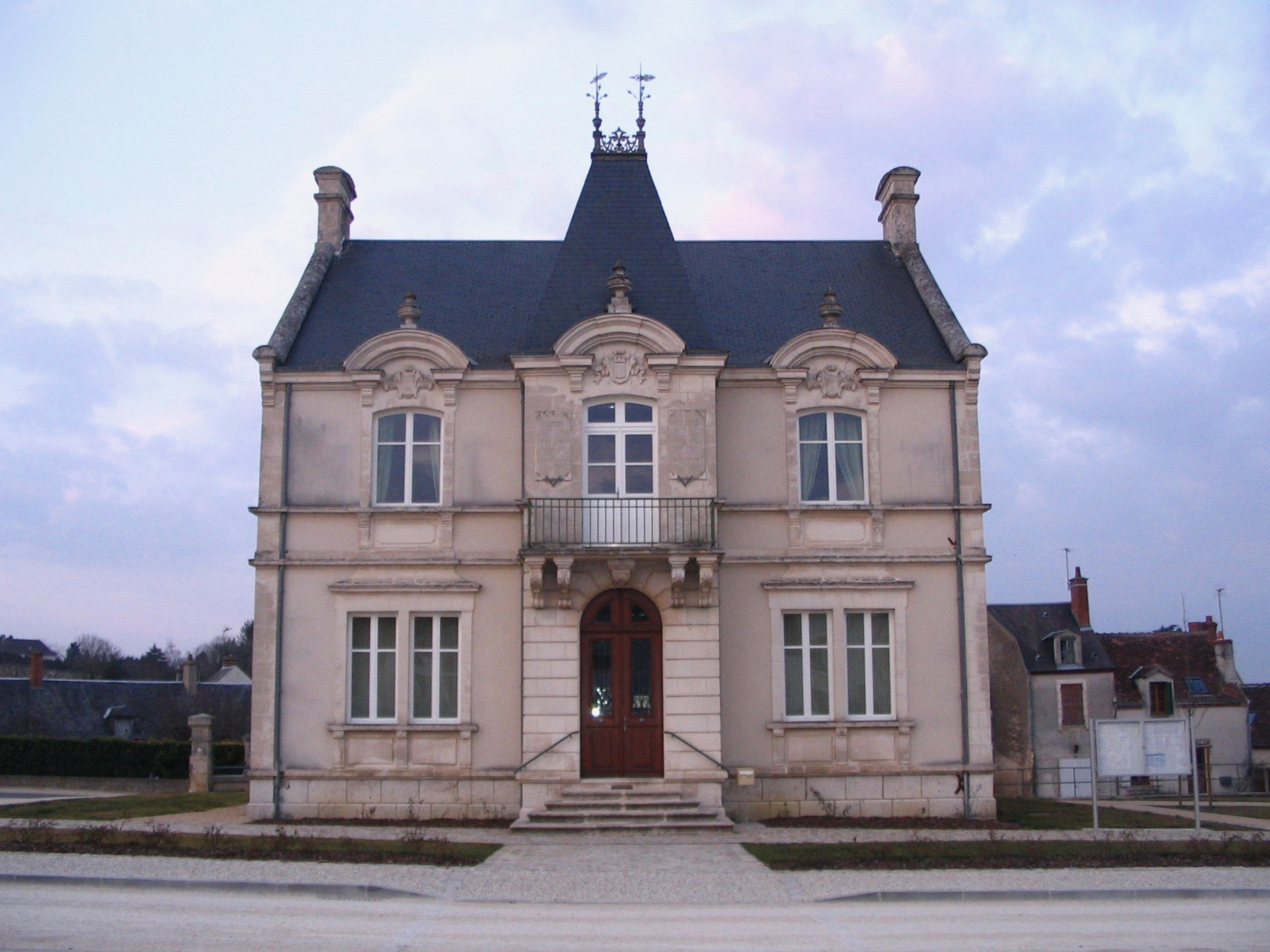
- The town hall in Reuilly

- Coat of arms
- Location of Reuilly
- Location within France Location within Centre-Val de Loire
- Coordinates: 47°05′05″N 2°02′42″E
- Country: France
- Region: Centre-Val de Loire
- Department: Indre
- Arrondissement: Issoudun
- Canton: Levroux
- Intercommunality: Pays d'Issoudun

Government
  - Mayor (2024–2026): Carole Baptista De Horta
- Area^{1}: 25.8 km^{2} (10.0 sq mi)
- Elevation: 114 m (374 ft)
- Highest elevation: 167 m (548 ft)
- Lowest elevation: 107 m (351 ft)
- Population (2023): 1,984
  - Density: 76.9/km^{2} (199/sq mi)
- Time zone: UTC+01:00 (CET)
  - Summer (DST): UTC+02:00 (CEST)
- INSEE/Postal code: 36171 /36260
- ^{1} French Land Register data, which excludes lakes, ponds, glaciers > 1 km^{2} (0.386 sq mi or 247 acres) and river estuaries.

Reuilly (French pronunciation: [ʁœji]) is a commune in the Indre department in central France.

It is about 15 km south of Vierzon, and 30 km west of Bourges. The area around Reuilly is noted for its wine; there is a designated Reuilly AOC.

== Population ==
Historical population
| Year | Pop. | ±% p.a. |
|---|---|---|
| 1968 | 2,020 | — |
| 1975 | 2,036 | +0.11% |
| 1982 | 2,017 | −0.13% |
| 1990 | 1,952 | −0.41% |
| 1999 | 1,963 | +0.06% |
| 2007 | 1,991 | +0.18% |
| 2012 | 2,073 | +0.81% |
| 2017 | 2,025 | −0.47% |
| 2023 | 1,984 | −0.34% |
Source: INSEE

== See also ==
- Communes of the Indre department
