= Ressources Investment =

French agricultural land investment company

- Company type: Joint-stock company
- ISIN: SIREN code: 820099646
- Industry: Holding company
- Founded: 2016
- Revenue: €470,900 in 2017
- Net income: −€29,100 in 2017
- Members: Keqin Hu; Marc Fressange; Jingwen Zhao
- Footnotes / references Debt: €62,000 in 2017

Ressources Investment, a French agricultural land investment company, was established in 2016 under the leadership of Keqin Hu, a Chinese entrepreneur. In the 2010s, the organization became well known in the media by procuring hundreds of hectares of farmland in France.

Keqin Hu is the Chairman of Ressources Investment and the head of Reward Group, also known as Luowa in China. Since its foundation in 1995, the Chinese company has expanded into three business areas, namely household products, real estate, and food, including milk powder marketing. In response to a food scandal related to milk in China, the group decided to diversify its sources by procuring products from countries that follow standard regulations. This approach was taken to restore consumer confidence in the products' quality. The superior quality of French production and the alluring potential of its land prompted billionaire Keqin Hu to invest in cereal farms in France. The objective was to ship the flour that was produced to support a forthcoming chain of 1,500 bakeries.

As a consequence of Reward Group's bankruptcy in 2019 and Keqin Hu's absence from the media spotlight, only three bakeries were established, marking the project's ultimate failure. Nevertheless, the farm acquisitions that Reward Group made during the 2010s have significant political ramifications. The deficiencies of France's land control agencies are brought to light and reignite concerns about the potential loss of food sovereignty resulting from foreign land grabbing.

== Context ==
=== Keqin Hu project ===
HongYang specializes in manufacturing and marketing equipment for service stations and the oil industry. The company conducts its operations in Europe through Beijing Reward International Trade, which was founded in 1995 and produces and markets milk powder. Keqin Hu, born in China in 1958 and married to Xia Zhao in 1992, leads the company. According to Forbes, he is ranked among China's wealthiest people, with a net worth of 1.22 billion dollars in 2018.

He plans to provide Chinese consumers with high-end baked goods, specifically "French-style" bread like baguettes or country bread. His goal for 2018 is to establish a chain of 1,500 bakeries within five years.

Chinese consumers' increased concern with traceability due to food scandals has led to higher expectations. He decided to source flour from France for guaranteed quality of raw materials and to maintain control over the entire production chain, from wheat cultivation to product distribution. Despite a long-standing interest from Chinese investors in French vineyards, Keqin Hu's HongYang group regularly purchases cereal farms. Recently, they acquired a 13,000 hectare dairy farm in Mongolia. There is nothing novel in the procedure: neither are they the pioneers to have employed the method, nor the first non-natives to have done so. Agriland of Belgium possesses 12,000 hectares of land in the northern region.

The project's financial success, comprising flour production in France followed by its shipment to China, results from the economical land value in France when distinguished from the steep prices elsewhere. Keqin Hu made an agreement with French cooperative Axéréal, represented by Jean-François Loiseau, to manage the harvest. In 2017, the cooperative shipped only 50 tons of flour to China and its bakers oversaw the training of their Chez Blandine counterparts. The Chinese company even declared its intention to establish a school in 2018 where French craftsmen would teach their savoir.

=== Agri-business scandals in China ===
The Chinese populace increasingly lost confidence in the quality and safety of their products. in a shift towards seeking safety assurances in countries with established standards. The food scandals that have plagued China have played a significant role in the emergence of Ressources Investment. The decline in consumer confidence, especially with regards to milk products marketed by firms owned by Keqin Hu, a Chinese billionaire, has pushed him to seek substitutes.

In 2008, China was rocked by a food scandal that centered on milk. Sanlu, one of the largest food corporations in China, had received complaints about their product line since December 2007. Their milk contained melamine, an ingredient classified as toxic by the WHO, which was added to exaggerate its protein content. The government concealed the scandal and rejected proposals to remove the tainted items from the market due to the country's heightened media exposure during the 2008 Beijing Olympics. The scandal's revelation in September 2008 originated from a New Zealand cooperative partner of Sanlu. According to official reports, the number of victims surpassed 290,000 after 10 months of distribution, with 51,900 hospitalized. There have been three recorded deaths and eleven suspected cases of melamine poisoning in the provinces.

Battery manufacturers' mining operations discharged significant amounts of cadmium into the Longjiang River. The river is contaminated officially for over a hundred kilometers with the possibility of it extending to Hong Kong or Macau. According to readings, concentrations of the carcinogenic product exceed current Chinese standards by eight times, and local concentrations exceed the threshold by over 25 times. In fear of cadmium poisoning, residents of Liuzhou hastily purchased bottled water while Liujiang and its surrounding areas, which are home to 1.5 million people, are also at risk. The contaminated water affected the soil and rice fields. According to Nanjing University, in 2013, 10% of China's rice production was contaminated, which poses a significant threat to a country where 65% of the population consumes rice daily.

=== Affordable real estate in France ===
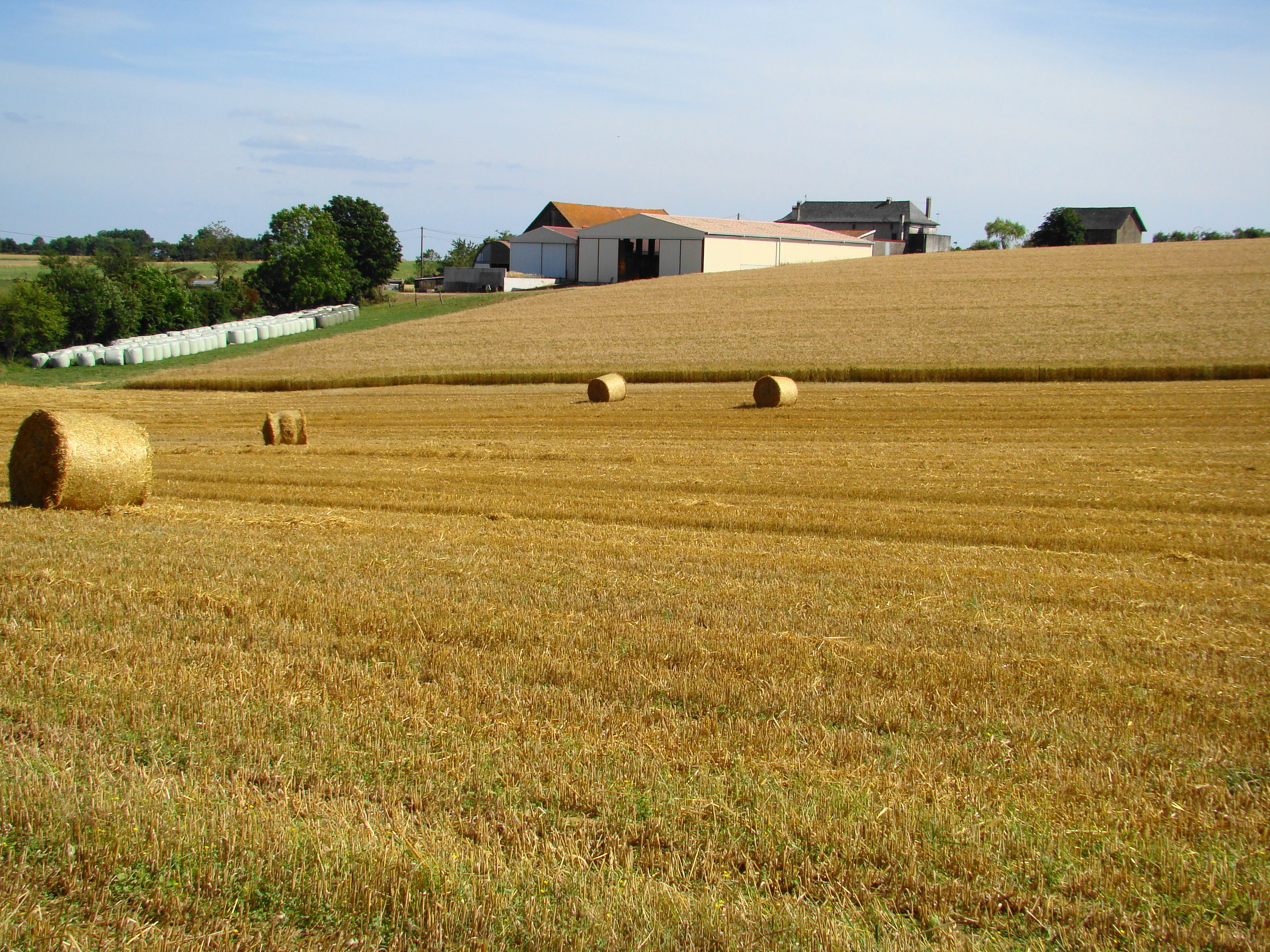
A farm in France

The French agricultural model, specifically family farming, is based on low land prices, which Safer, the price regulator, supports a priori. Farms must maintain their independence as family businesses and remain family-controlled in both capital and decision-making. Low prices should also facilitate capital acquisition for young farmers wishing to start their own businesses.

Subsequently, France has some of the most affordable arable land in Europe, with an assessed value of €6,060/ha in 2016. Due to its relatively affordable pricing, French land provides an attractive option for foreign investors. In Eastern Europe, land is priced at €9,100/ha in Poland and €12,000/ha in Slovakia which is higher than the rates observed in France. However, land in Romania, Estonia, Croatia and Lithuania is priced at less than €3,000/ha. Prices at the other end of the spectrum are much higher in the West, with €63,000/ha in the Netherlands, €40,000/ha in Italy, and €26,000/ha in Luxembourg and England. Even if a foreigner offers a price well above the French market price, it is still economical compared to the price in their home country. This results in both parties benefiting financially.

China faces significant challenges due to a scarcity of land on its territory, leading to difficulties in meeting the population's production expectations. Despite needing to provide food for 20% of the world's population, it only has 8–9% of agricultural land available. The intense land constraints on China have prompted the nation to invest abroad, specifically to secure their food supply. Instead of solely relying on the global market, China must now acquire the capacity to produce its food to avoid the devastating impacts of market failure, such as shortages and embargoes. But according to Jean-Joseph Boillot, China's agri-food industry remains outdated, but it still possesses the capability to sustain itself.

== Land acquisition ==
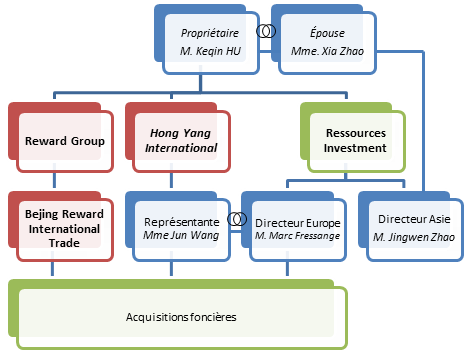
Resources Investment group organization chart

The Reward Group is set to acquire a plot of land with the capacity to produce flour for a bakery chain, which aims to include 1,500 stores eventually.

These European land acquisitions, starting in 2013, are part of China's national strategy to ensure food security and promote private enterprise investments abroad. The group is currently developing Shuangwa Aliment (or Beijing Shuangwa Dairy Co., Ltd), its existing subsidiary established in 1998. In particular, it promotes the distribution of products that bear the label of French-imported wheat flour, specifically bags of flour originating from France.

=== Bypassing Safer ===
The Sociétés d'aménagement foncier et d'établissement rural (Safer) ensure transparency in the rural land market. The organizations were established in accordance with the French agricultural policy law of 1960. Their objective is to improve landholding structures by creating new farms or forestry operations, or expanding existing ones through soil development and, if required, land parcel reorganization. Their responsibilities include diversifying landscapes, safeguarding natural resources and biological diversity, and communicating information regarding price trends and changes in the use of agricultural land to the relevant government departments as per decree conditions.

In order to uphold the stability of the rural land market, the local Safer has the right of pre-emption although there are restrictions imposed. Acquiring only a part of a company is not allowed. For the acquisition to occur, the entire company must be purchased or the ability to purchase the remaining portion must be obtained within two years in cases of partial acquisitions. If the buyer, or more precisely, the seller, does not intend to sell within two years, the Safer cannot pre-empt the purchase.

To avoid possible pre-emption, a legal loophole in the Safer's pre-emption right is used in preparing the acquisition. The laws applicable to direct land transfers differ from those for transfers through shares. Land is often organized into a corporate structure such as a Société civile d'exploitation agricole (SCEA) or a Groupement foncier agricole (GFA) for the purpose of easier land control and exchange. Through this system, the buyer obtains a share in the land while the seller retains ownership of the remainder. This method effectively avoids any possibility of a Safer exercising its right to pre-empt.

This methodology allows for the Chinese organization to obtain land while adhering to legal regulations, without the potential obstacle of the Safer impeding acquisitions. When SCAs are purchased, an intermediary, Marc Fressange, serves as manager or co-manager while maintaining the previous manager's position. Simultaneously, Jun Wang, HongYang's representative and Marc Fressange's spouse, approves specific acquisitions.

=== The intermediary, Marc Fressange ===
Details of Marc Fressange's mandates
2014–2020	Esperabent
2015–2019	Plaines à blé
2015–2019	Chambrisse
2015–2020	Domaine de la Tournancière
2016–2020	La Porte
2016–2020	Kluiskade
2016–2020	Grand Saulay
2016–2020	Bergeries
2019–2020	La Varenne
2019–2020	Acolin
2016–2020	Ressources Investment

Land acquisitions in France are not directly carried out by Ressources Investment, where Marc Fressange serves as European Director. Instead, they are conducted through Chinese companies that belong to the Reward Group. Despite this, Fressange's role as head of purchasing management is critical.

Fressange, a French businessman born in Honfleur in 1962, holds a degree from HEC and previously served as CEO of EMW, the joint venture between Ascential and Wanadoo.

He later founded and directed Ouh la la France, a company that specializes in importing and selling high quality French wines and food products in China. Chinese investors are familiar with this industry and have been purchasing numerous French vineyards since the early 2000s to promote wine tourism, attract customers, and expand their own marketing networks. Since 2002, the liberalization of the Chinese economy has encouraged these investments.

Marc Fressange began his involvement in the French agricultural sector in 2014 by establishing SCEA d'Esperabent. After Reward Group's acquisitions, Fressange was typically appointed as the managing director of the company, occasionally as a non-partner managing director. In 2016, he became the managing director of Ressource Investment. The company specializes in managing investment portfolios for the agri-food sector. Although he would have preferred it to be called Chambrisse Investment after the SCEA he is in the process of acquiring, Keqin Hu has maintained the name Ressource Investment. Fressange systematically appoints individuals to head up the farms acquired by the group, and this practice continues until the Chinese group goes bankrupt in 2019.

=== Land purchases ===
Ressources Investment (France)

In 2015, the press reported the purchase of hundreds of hectares of land in Clion and Châtillon, and a thousand hectares in Vendœuvres, despite prior acquisitions. Additionally, three farms in Indre were purchased in 2015, totaling 1,500 ha, without Safer being notified.

Resources Investment is available to assist farmers, including those experiencing financial troubles. This eases exchanges, as the farmer is constrained by time and cannot wait for another investor. The company is willing to contribute more funds than the French market permits, providing a 20% increase. This significantly affects an operator facing financial stress. The method of soliciting potential sellers is debatable as it exploits their vulnerability. Ultimately, farms are acquired unexpectedly and repurchased at significantly reduced prices, although this practice is not consistently applied.

In June 2014, the 102-hectare SCEA des Plaines à Blé was procured for €280,000. In October of the same year, the head office was relocated from Villanier in Brigueuil, Charente to Quiberville in Seine-Maritime. The subsequent month saw Marc Fressange appointed as managing director, while Alain Braconnier resigned from the organization.

At the close of 2014, investors persisted in purchasing farms, conspicuously in Châtillon-sur-Loire located in the Indre area. This transaction implicated SCEA Chambrisse, an agricultural corporation established in 1994 by Irish citizens who cultivated a thousand hectares, containing 518 hectares owned by themselves. Hong Yang procured 98% of the cereal farm for €4,000,000. The remaining 2% was maintained by the preceding proprietors, who presently operate as the company's administrators, accompanied by Marc Fressange. Their power is limited as they do not have the legal authorization to incur expenses that exceed €1,000.

On March 20, 2015, Hong Yang purchased an additional 98% stake in a farm, located in Vendoeuvre. The remaining 2% of the stake's usufruct was temporarily held by Didier Delmond for 20 years, while the bare ownership was retained by SARL Indor, a holding company established in 2007 by Didier Delmond and Jean Freyssenge. The SCEA Tournancière, established in 2007 but with a history tracing back to 1987, operates over 550 hectares of land, out of which 180 hectares are leased for farming. The acquisition cost for the farm was a mere €15,000.

Hong Yang procured another farm in 2015 and went on to purchase the majority shares (99%) in SCEA du Grand Mée, which covers a total area of 120 hectares in the commune of Clion at "Grand Mée," for €250,000 due to pressing time constraints and pressure from banking institutions. On September 15, Kequin purchased 78% of the shares in GFA du Kluiskade, which is linked to SCEA du Grand Mée. Meanwhile, 19% of the shares were acquired by the wife of Marc Fressange, who represents the Hong Yang company. Ronald Ammerlaan became a wholesaler for agricultural equipment.

On the same day, Kequin Hu acquired 72% of GFA Laporte, while the Chinese representative purchased 18%, and Emmanuel Laporte, who established the company in 2013, retained the remaining 10%. Despite these acquisitions, Marc Fressange remains the appointed manager. Afterwards, Le Grand Saulay, a 104-hectare farm, was obtained for €100,000. Emmanuel Laporte possesses ten of the one thousand shares, valuing €10 each, with the other 990 held by Beijing Reward International Trade, a subsidiary of Reward Group.

In 2017, a purchase of 900 hectares of wheat and corn was made in La Bourdonnais, Allier from Pierre Meyer, who owned GFA de la Varenne and Acolin. Due to changes in legislation, Safer was informed of the transaction, but was unable to intervene. The expenditure in the Allier region is estimated to be around 11–12 million dollars. After the acquisition, the farm did not renew its fleet of equipment. The technical schedule has not been altered, and both farm workers are still employed.

SCEA La Bergerie located in La Berthenoux was sold by Philippe Plisson, who died in early 2018, for €942,000 at 99% for the land measuring 138 hectares.

The Chinese group's relatively low investment level restricted the farmers from establishing their own export subsidiary. For this purpose, they would need to attain a surface area of at least 10,000 ha to be able to fill trains or boats heading towards Asia. In common with other local farmers, the Chinese group collaborates with the Axéréal cooperative. They purchase seeds, fertilizers, and phytosanitary products from the cooperative and market their produce through it. However, since the production process is not labor-intensive, there is minimal effect on local employment.

==== Company information table on structures ====
Structure	Creation date	Registered office	Capital	Marc Fressange's position	Change of registered office	Other representatives
SAS Ressources Investment	28 April 2016	Rue de Téhéran, Paris	500 000 euros	chief executive officer since May 10, 2016		Keqin H since May 10, 2016 Jingwen Zhao since May 10, 2016
SCEA Esperabent	5 March 2014	Liarès, Ordan-Larroque	10 000 euros	Non-associate manager since April 11, 2014		None
SCEA Plaines à Blé	1 December 2012	Villanier, Brigueuil	1 000 euros	Non-associate managing director since October 8, 2014	Rue des Champs, Quiberville	Alain Braconnier from February 15, 2013, to September 14, 2016
SCEA Chambrisse	7 October 1985	Chambrisse, Châtillon-sur-Indre	182 542,45 euros	managing director since November 4, 2014		Tom Doherty since September 9, 2008 Donald Keating since September 9, 2008 Francis Taylor since September 5, 2014
GFA Kluiskade	1 May 1987	Le Grand Mée, Clion (Indre)	6 426 euros	managing director since February 25, 2016	Chambrisse, Châtillon-sur-Indre	Ronaldus Ammerlaan since December 5, 2006
SCEA Grand Mée	1 May 1987	Le Grand Mée, Clion (Indre)	104 805 euros	managing director since March 18, 2016	Chambrisse, Châtillon-sur-Indre	Ronaldus Ammerlaan since December 5, 2006
SCEA Grand Saulay	5 February 2013	Rue Charles Floquet, Paris	10 000 euros	managing director since June 28, 2016	Rue des Champs, Quiberville	Emmanuel Laporte from March 1, 2013, to November 11, 2017, Nicolas Hertault since November 23, 2016
GFA Laporte	23 January 2013	Rue Charles Floquet, Paris	10 000 euros	managing director since January 27, 2016	Rue des Champs, Quiberville	Emmanuel Laporte since February 19, 2013
SCEA Domaine de la Tournancière	27 October 1987	Domaine de la Tournancière, Vendœuvres	15 000 euros	managing director since August 21, 2015	Rue des Champs, Quiberville	Christophe Leplicher from January 29, 2008, to August 21, 2015, Didier Delmond from January 29, 2008, to November 10, 2017
SCEA Bergeries	2 January 2016	Lieu-dit les Bergeries, La Berthenoux	942 000 euros	managing director since July 28, 2016		Philippe Plisson since January 16, 2016
GFA Varenne	7 January 1985	La Varenne, Thiel-sur-Acolin	2 678 680,86 euros	Non-partner manager since April 11, 2019		Pierre Meyer since January 28, 2012
GFA Acolin	29 February 2012	Les Bizets, Thiel-sur-Acolin	292 000 euros	Non-partner manager since April 12, 2019		Pierre Meyer since May 8, 2012

== Reward Group bankruptcy ==
While the Reward Group reports having RMB 4,150 million available as of September 2018, it was unable to repay a debt of only RMB 300 million by December 2018. In January 2019, the rating agency Fitch Ratings issued a warning about this issue, emphasizing the lack of transparency regarding Chinese companies' accounting practices and information disclosure.

The Chinese group ultimately filed for bankruptcy in May 2019, while French company Ressources Investment remained operational. French land is being cultivated. The three Chinese bakeries "Chez Blandine" have closed their doors. While Keqin Hu previously welcomed journalists to discuss his project, he now avoids the media spotlight. The Chinese government has announced restrictions aimed at improving corporate debt management. The group's accounting firm has been suspended for six months due to insufficient due diligence. As of December 31, 2018, the group had a total debt of $6 billion, with only $497 million in available cash, of which $411 million cannot be mobilized.

== Analysis and implications ==
=== Politics ===
To obtain food resources beyond its borders, China is not relying solely on agricultural markets. Instead, it invests in the necessary resources to produce food. This generates a significant challenge for French food safety. Because the actions of the Chinese group may pose a threat to French food sovereignty, a political debate is taking place to adopt stringent measures to prevent the recurrence of such situations.

On April 7, 2016, Safer issued an alert through a press release following a land purchase. Safer reiterated this alert on May 26, 2016, during its annual conference, at the request of its president Emmanuel Hyest. In June of the same year, Dominique Potier, a member of parliament, proposed an amendment on this matter as part of the Saupin bill after consulting with various stakeholders. The MP had previously brought forth an initial proposal on the topic in 2013:

"FNSafer wants to take advantage of the Sapin II bill (on transparency, the fight against corruption and the modernization of economic life) currently under review to open up the right of pre-emption to partial sales. It also wants to make shareholdings that result in effective and lasting control of farms subject to authorization to operate."

— Inter-Environment Brussels

The company's activities extend to the French National Assembly. The French Ministry of Agriculture and Food has noted that:

"Recent purchases of French farmland by Chinese investors in Indre in 2016 and then in Allier in 2017 have revealed that land regulation tools are inadequate in the face of the development of concentration phenomena through corporate ownership."

— French Ministry of Agriculture and Food

A bipartisan committee consisting of both House and Senate representatives approved measures to enhance transparency in the sale of agricultural land. A law to regulate the acquisition of such land by foreign industrialists was enacted in January 2017. The amendments addressing the provisions were successfully passed by Rapporteur Daniel Gremillet. But the Constitutional Council censured Article 3 of the law addressing farmland grabbing and biocontrol development in decision no. 2017-748 DC on March 16, 2017, since the article was deemed unconstitutional, in violation of entrepreneurial and contractual freedoms.

In early 2018, President Emmanuel Macron announced plans to redefine the role and governance of Safer:

"For me, farmland in France is a strategic investment on which our sovereignty depends, so we can't let hundreds of hectares be bought up by foreign powers without knowing the purpose of these purchases."

— President Emmanuel Macron.

A protest was held in August 2018 at the Grand Mée field and was organized by the Confédération paysanne which gathered around one hundred farmers.

A report on agricultural land was delivered in December 2018 by a parliamentary mission. However, the Ministry of Agriculture has expressed doubt on the possibility of making amendments to the legislation before the end of the five-year period which ends in 2022.

=== Economic ===
==== Property market ====
The number of farms owned by companies increased before the scandal. In the early 2000s, Safer land reserves were the only lands owned by companies. Nowadays, the trend has changed. A significant percentage of French lands, ranging from 15% to 20%, are now owned by corporations, either by farmers or supermarket chains. In 2017, roughly 18.5% of land sold was in the form of shares.

The cost of agricultural land is increasing, resulting in declining yields that dropped by 40% from 1982 to 2014. Currently, a farmer needs eight years of farming to afford a hectare, compared to just five in the early 2000s.

Foreign land purchases represented only 1.6% of the number of transactions in 2017 but accounted for 9.2% of their total value. Chinese investment in the trade and chemicals sectors amounted to 14% and 8%, respectively, which is significantly lower than the 2% invested in agrifood in 2016.

Over a two-year period between 2016 and 2018, prices per hectare increased from an average of 6,000 euros to 10,000 euros in Indre. Robert Chaze, the President of the Chamber of Agriculture, attributes the rise in prices to Chinese investors and estimates that the impact of 1,700 hectares alone could not have been responsible for such a significant effect on the market.

==== Destabilization of Le Chatelard 1802 ====
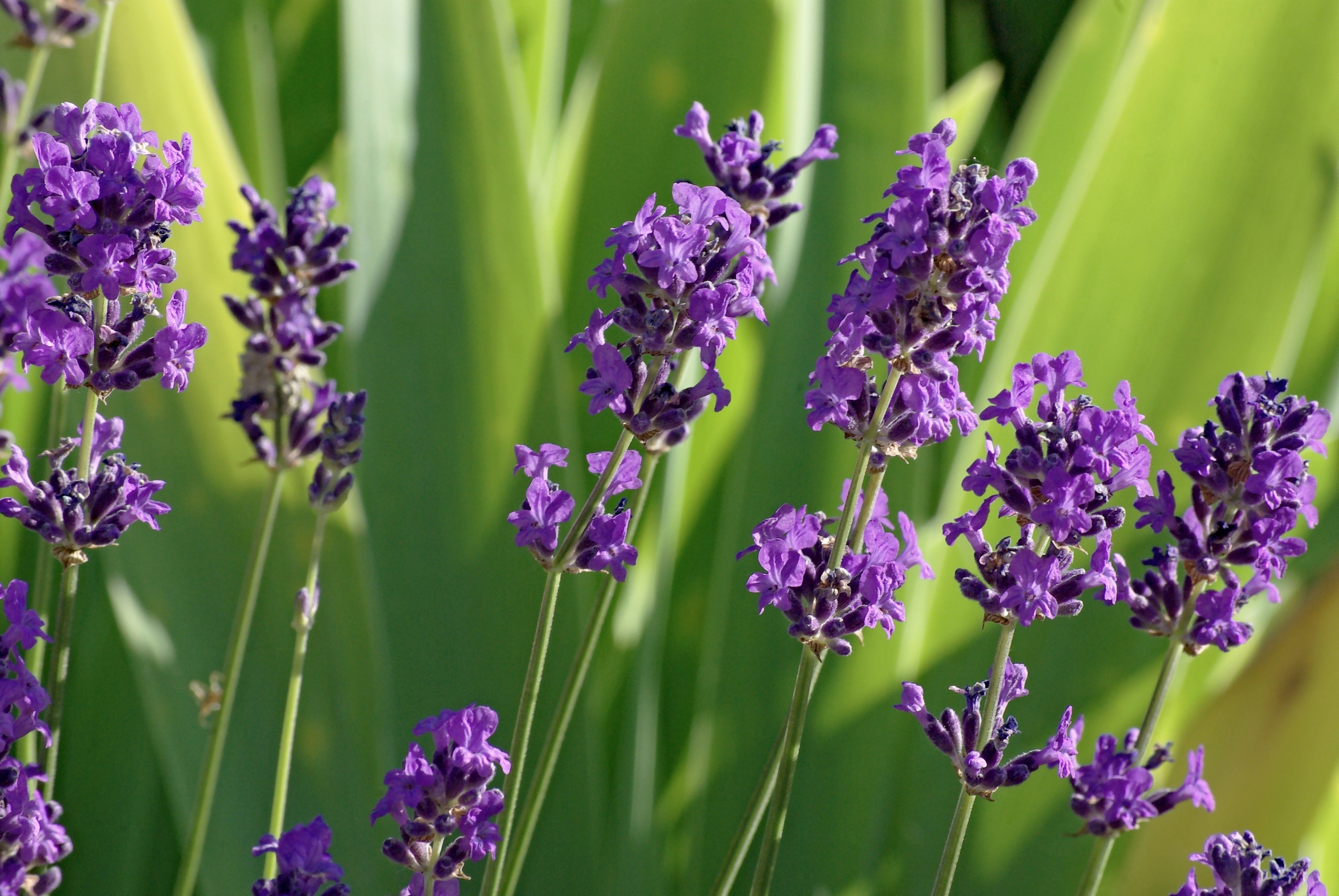
Lavender

In addition to acquiring farms, Ressources Investment investors also acquired Le Chatelard 1802. This is a company involved in producing and marketing lavender, located at Saint-Auban-sur-l'Ouvèze in the Drôme region. The bankruptcy of Reward Group had severe effects on the company.

In 2017, the founders accepted a proposal from Reward Group to upgrade, enlarge, and recruit to support an international expansion. Reward Group acquired 75% of the company and became the major shareholder. The company is seeking franchisees with an entry fee of $10,000 and royalties of 4% of sales. They plan to invest $18 million to increase the number of production lines to ten by the end of 2019. This expansion would triple the company's workforce and significantly increase sales to $120 million, with 90% of sales being exports. In comparison, 68% of sales were exports in 2017 with a total revenue of $5.6 million.

On October 23, 2018, the company renewed its officers. NextStage, the previous shareholder, departed the organization to make way for a team of six directors and a managing director from China. Christophe and Sébastien Montaud alleged the Chinese team failed to realize their commitments and declared their resignation effective November 3, 2018, on September 10, 2018. They relinquished their posts as president and director to the new team. Le Chatelard 1802 was placed into receivership in July 2019 due to a payment suspension in June.

== Appendix ==
=== Bibliographie ===
- Levesque, R. Les acquisitions chinoises dans le Berry. Un cas européen. archive La revue foncière. Mai-juin 2016. n° 11
- Potier, D. Rapport fait au nom de la commission des affaires économiques, sur la proposition de loi relative à la lutte contre l’accaparement des terres agricoles et au développement du biocontrôle (n° 4344) archive

=== Vidéographie ===
- ARTE Reportage – Egypt: dancing against censorship / China: the disappearance of billionaires archive
- China: the disappearance of the billionaires | ARTE archive
