= François d'Astier de La Vigerie =

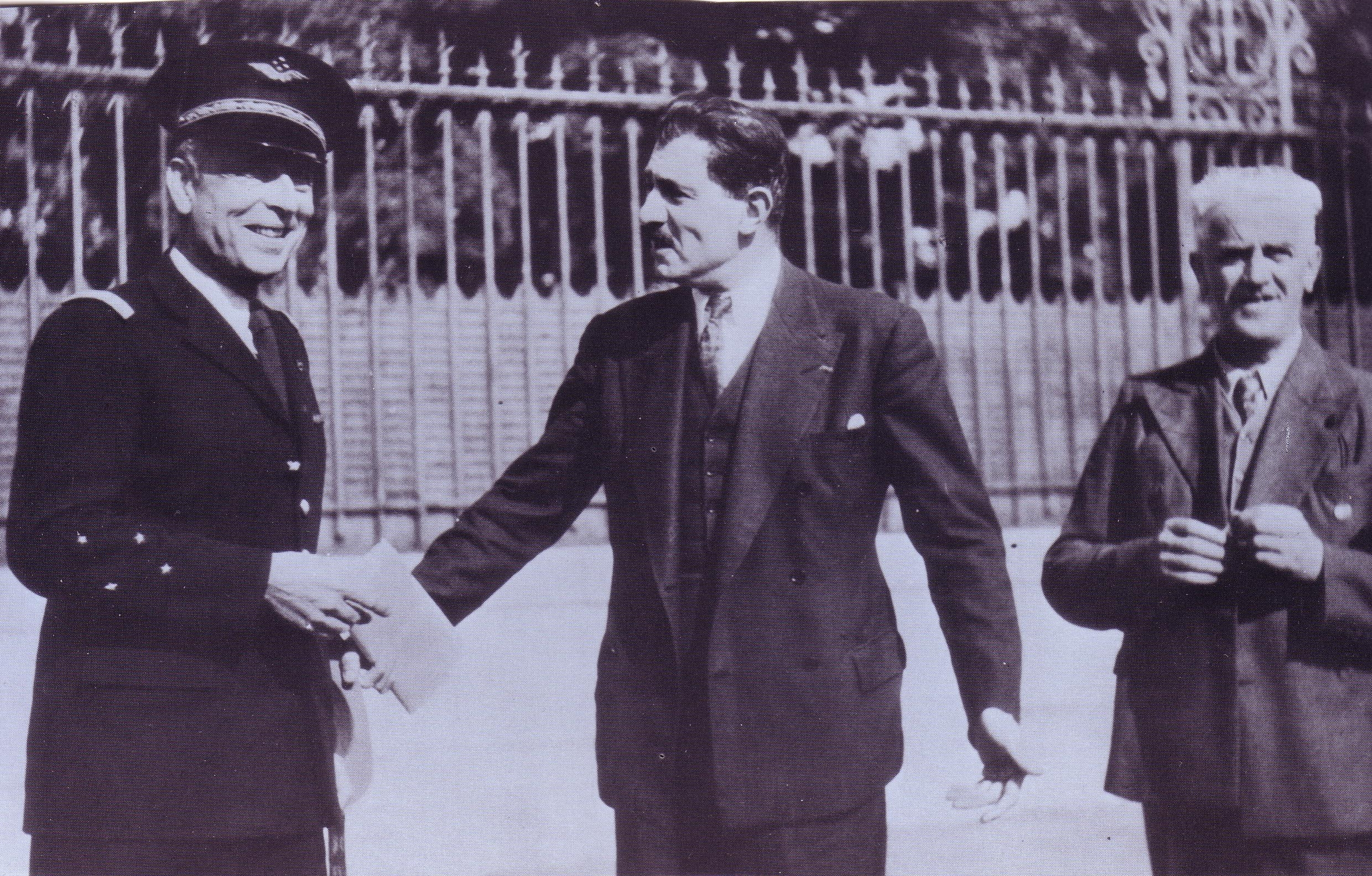
D'Astier (L) with Max Hymans and Paul Parpai

François d'Astier de La Vigerie (7 March 1886 – 9 October 1956) was a French military leader during the two World Wars.

His family were from Vivarais, and were ennobled in 1829 under the French Restoration. His father, le baron Raoul d'Astier de La Vigerie, was an artillery officer, and his mother, Jeanne, née Masson-Bachasson de Montalivet, was the granddaughter of Camille, comte de Montalivet, who had been Minister of the Interior under Louis-Philippe I of France. François d’Astier was brought up partly in Paris and partly at the Château de Rançay at Niherne.

== Military career ==
Having attended the Ecole Spéciale Militaire de Saint-Cyr, he became a lieutenant in 1911 and was attached to a cavalry regiment when the First World War broke out in August 1914. He was an officer of the 1st Infantry Brigade of the 1st Moroccan Infantry Division in 1915, and gained his pilot's licence in 1916. In the course of the war he won the Croix de Guerre and seven citations.

During the inter-war years, he took several administrative positions, including postings in Finland and Italy. He was involved in the war in Morocco between 1927 and 1929. By 1936, he was the youngest general in France, commanding the 23rd aerial brigade. When war broke out in 1939, he was appointed inspector-general of military schools. In December he was sent to Algiers to coordinate French military operations in Europe and northwestern Africa, and advised General Vuillemin and Admiral Darlan to transfer the French Air Force to North Africa; his advice was not taken.

In July 1940, d'Astier refused to obey Darlan's order to attack British warships at Gibraltar, and a month later he was relieved of his command. Returning to France, he joined "La Dernière Colonne", a Resistance group, and in 1942, his brother Emmanuel delivered a letter from De Gaulle, inviting d'Astier to join him. He was sent to Algeria to prepare for de Gaulle's arrival in North Africa, and was subsequently named commander of the French forces in the UK. At the beginning of 1944, he was supporting General Eisenhower in preparations for the invasion of France. After carrying out further missions in Algeria and Spain, he rejoined de Gaulle after the liberation of Paris.

In November 1944, d'Astier was made a Compagnon de la Libération and became France's ambassador in Rio de Janeiro.

== Works ==
- Les Cahiers de la France Libérée (1946)
- Mermoz (1946)
- Le ciel n'était pas vide (1952)
