= Arpheuilles =

Arpheuilles may refer to the following places in France:

- Arpheuilles, Cher, a commune in the department of Cher
- Arpheuilles, Indre, a commune in the department of Indre
- Arpheuilles-Saint-Priest, a commune in the department of Allier
