= Villers-les-Ormes =

- Part of Saint-Maur
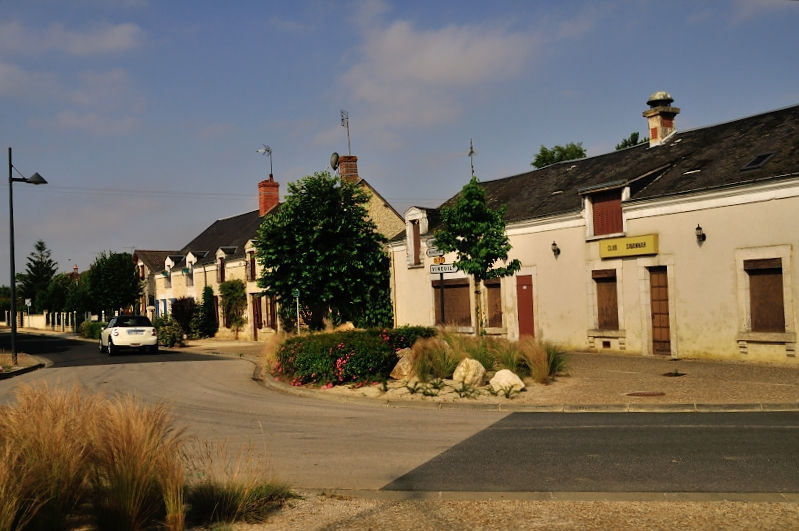
- A view within Villers-les-Ormes
- Location of Villers-les-Ormes
- Location within France Location within Centre-Val de Loire
- Coordinates: 46°52′14″N 1°38′01″E
- Country: France
- Region: Centre-Val de Loire
- Department: Indre
- Arrondissement: Châteauroux
- Canton: Levroux
- Commune: Saint-Maur
- Area^{1}: 17.6 km^{2} (6.8 sq mi)
- Elevation: 156 m (512 ft)
- Highest elevation: 169 m (554 ft)
- Lowest elevation: 141 m (463 ft)
- Population (2023): 439
  - Density: 24.9/km^{2} (64.6/sq mi)
- Time zone: UTC+01:00 (CET)
  - Summer (DST): UTC+02:00 (CEST)
- Postal code: 36250
- ^{1} French Land Register data, which excludes lakes, ponds, glaciers > 1 km^{2} (0.386 sq mi or 247 acres) and river estuaries.

Villers-les-Ormes (French pronunciation: [vilɛʁ lez‿ɔʁm]) is a former commune in the Indre department in central France. On 1 January 2016, it was merged into the commune of Saint-Maur.

== See also ==
- Communes of the Indre department
