= François Hector d'Albert de Rions =

French Navy officer of the War of American Independence

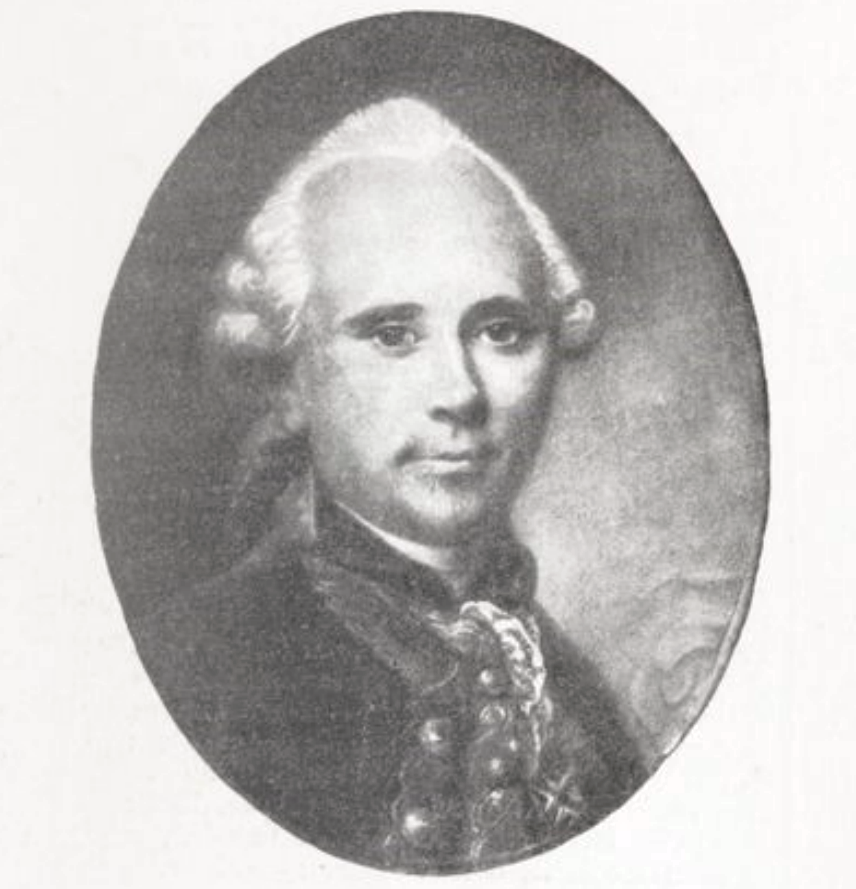
- Born: 19 February 1728; Avignon, Papal States
- Died: 2 October 1802 (aged 74); Saint-Auban-sur-l'Ouvèze, France
- Military career
- Branch: French Navy; Armée des Princes
- Rank: contre-amiral
- Conflicts: Seven Years' War; Battle of Cartagena; American Revolutionary War; Battle of Grenada; Siege of Savannah; Battle of the Chesapeake; Battle of the Saintes

François Hector d'Albert, comte de Rioms or Rions (19 February 1728, Avignon – 2 October 1802, Saint-Auban-sur-l'Ouvèze) was a French Navy officer. He served in the War of American Independence, earning a membership in the Society of Cincinnati.

== Biography ==
Albert de Rions was born to the family of an Army general. He joined the Navy as a Garde-Marine on 26 December 1743. He started by escorting convoys in the Caribbean in 1746, and by cruising off Tripoli in 1752. He was promoted to Lieutenant on 15 May 1756.

Albert de Rions was taken prisoner by the British at Louisbourg in 1755. Freed in 1757, he was again taken prisoner at the Battle of Cartagena on 28 February 1758.

From 1768 he commanded the 20-gun xebec Séduisant, cruising between Toulon and Livorno and taking part in the French conquest of Corsica.

He was promoted to Captain on 18 February 1772. In 1778, he commanded the 50-gun Sagittaire in the squadron under D'Estaing. He took part in the Battle of Grenada on 6 July 1779 and in the naval part of the Siege of Savannah. On 23 September 1779, he captured the 50-gun HMS Experiment, which was subsequently taken into French service.

He was promoted to the command of the 74-gun Marseillais, before transferring on Pluton. He took part in the Battle of the Chesapeake on 5 September 1781, the Battle of Saint Kitts on 25 January 1782, and in the Battle of the Saintes on 12 April 1782.

He was promoted to Chef d'Escadre on 20 August 1784. From 1 January 1785, he was commander of the Navy in Toulon. The next year, he organised a simulated naval battle with the 74-gun Patriote for Louis XVI's visit to Cherbourg.

In January 1788, he was appointed commander of the naval forces of Toulon. The life of the workers of the arsenal was dire: their pay very low, they were liable find employment only one out of two or three days, and due to the financial crisis they were also often paid only with delay. The bad harvest of 1789 and harsh winter that year compounded the issue by raising prices, and the ensuing misery yielded unrest. Albert de Rions reacted with rigidity and scorn, notably forbidding them to wear cockades. This further alienated the workers, and on 1 December 1789, workers of Toulon arsenal rioted and seized him. The National Assembly had him released, and replaced by Joseph de Flotte. Albert de Rions was appointed commander of the Brest squadron, but failed to restore discipline there too.

He was promoted to contre-amiral on 1 January 1792, but abandoned his port to become an émigré and joined the Armée des Princes. He returned in France in 1801 to retire.

== Sources and references ==
Citations

Bibliography

- Contenson, Ludovic (1934). La Société des Cincinnati de France et la guerre d'Amérique (1778-1783). Paris: éditions Auguste Picard. OCLC 7842336.
- Lacour-Gayet, Georges (1910). La marine militaire de la France sous le règne de Louis XVI. Paris: Honoré Champion.
- Moulin, Stéphane (1922). La Carrière d'un Marin au XVIIIème siècle; Joseph de Flotte 1734-1792. Gap: éditions Jean et Peyrot. OCLC 902496109.
- Roche, Jean-Michel (2005). Dictionnaire des bâtiments de la flotte de guerre française de Colbert à nos jours, 1671 - 1870. Group Retozel-Maury Millau. pp. 325–6. ISBN 978-2-9525917-0-6. OCLC 165892922.
- Taillemite, Étienne (2002). Dictionnaire des Marins français. Tallandier. ISBN 2-84734-008-4. OCLC 606770323.
- Troude, Onésime-Joachim (1867). Batailles navales de la France (in French). Vol. 2. Challamel ainé.
- Vergé-Franceschi, Michel (2002). Dictionnaire d'Histoire maritime. Paris: Robert Laffont. ISBN 2-221-08751-8.
