= Flere =

Flere is a surname. Notable people with the surname include:

- Janez Flere (born 1959), Argentine alpine skier
- Jože Flere (born 1968), Slovene Paralympian athlete
- Juan Flere (born 1998), Argentine footballer

== See also ==
- Fléré-la-Rivière
