= Sougé =

Sougé may refer to the following places in France:

- Sougé, Indre, a commune in the Indre department
- Sougé, Loir-et-Cher, a commune in the Loir-et-Cher department
