= Palluau-sur-Indre =

- Commune
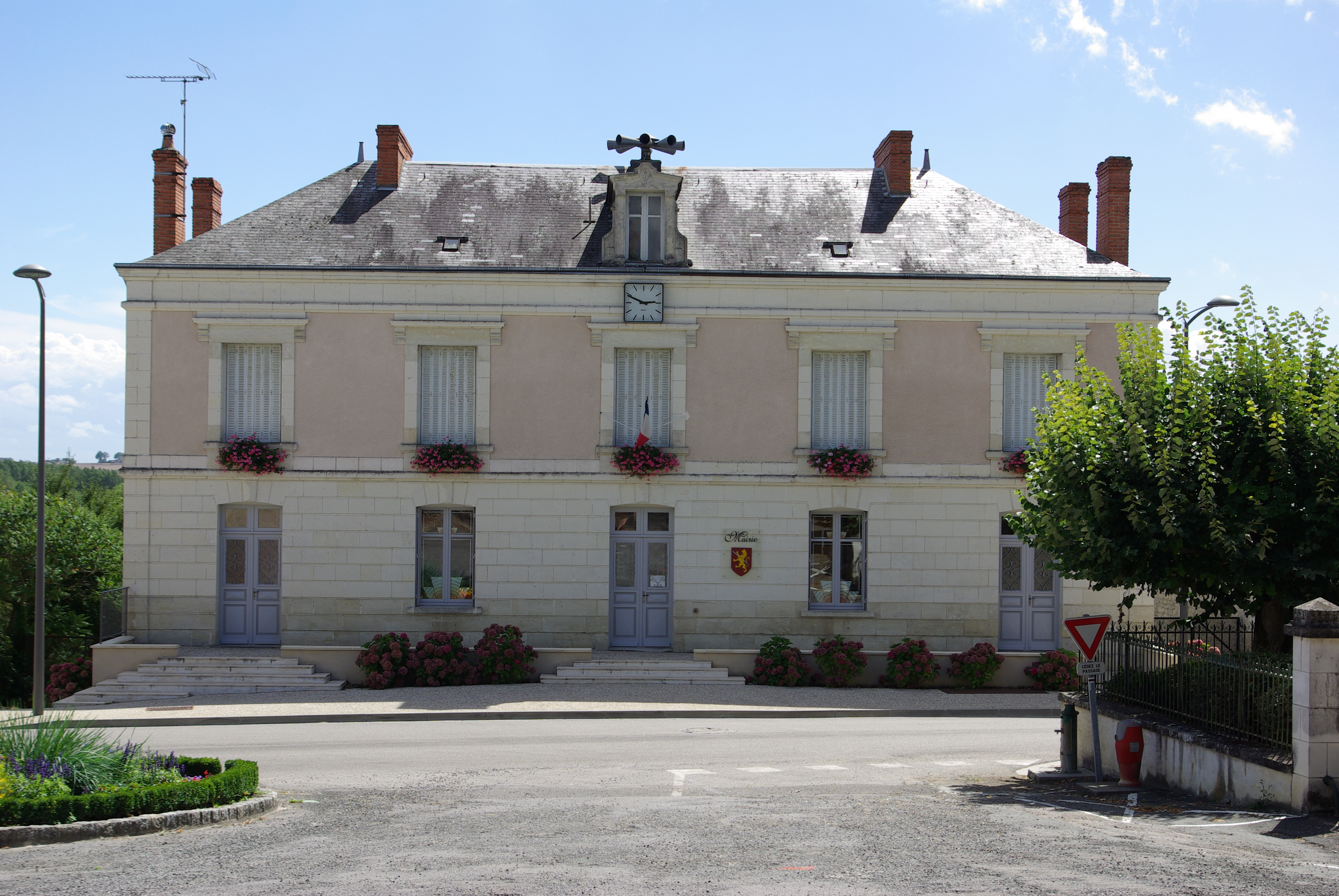
- Town hall

- Coat of arms
- Location of Palluau-sur-Indre
- Location within France Location within Centre-Val de Loire
- Coordinates: 46°56′41″N 1°18′45″E
- Country: France
- Region: Centre-Val de Loire
- Department: Indre
- Arrondissement: Châteauroux
- Canton: Buzançais

Government
  - Mayor (2020–2026): Marc Rouffy
- Area^{1}: 41.55 km^{2} (16.04 sq mi)
- Elevation: 177 m (581 ft)
- Highest elevation: 196 m (643 ft)
- Lowest elevation: 91 m (299 ft)
- Population (2023): 785
  - Density: 18.9/km^{2} (48.9/sq mi)
- Time zone: UTC+01:00 (CET)
  - Summer (DST): UTC+02:00 (CEST)
- INSEE/Postal code: 36149 /36500
- ^{1} French Land Register data, which excludes lakes, ponds, glaciers > 1 km^{2} (0.386 sq mi or 247 acres) and river estuaries.

Palluau-sur-Indre (French pronunciation: [palɥo syʁ ɛ̃dʁ], literally Palluau upon Indre) is a commune in the Indre department in central France.

== Population ==
Historical population
Year	Pop.	±% p.a.
1968	1,154	—
1975	1,028	−1.64%
1982	1,017	−0.15%
1990	905	−1.45%
1999	828	−0.98%
2007	792	−0.55%
2012	759	−0.85%
2017	789	+0.78%
2023	785	−0.08%
Source: INSEE

== See also ==
- Communes of the Indre department
