= Villedieu-sur-Indre =

- Commune
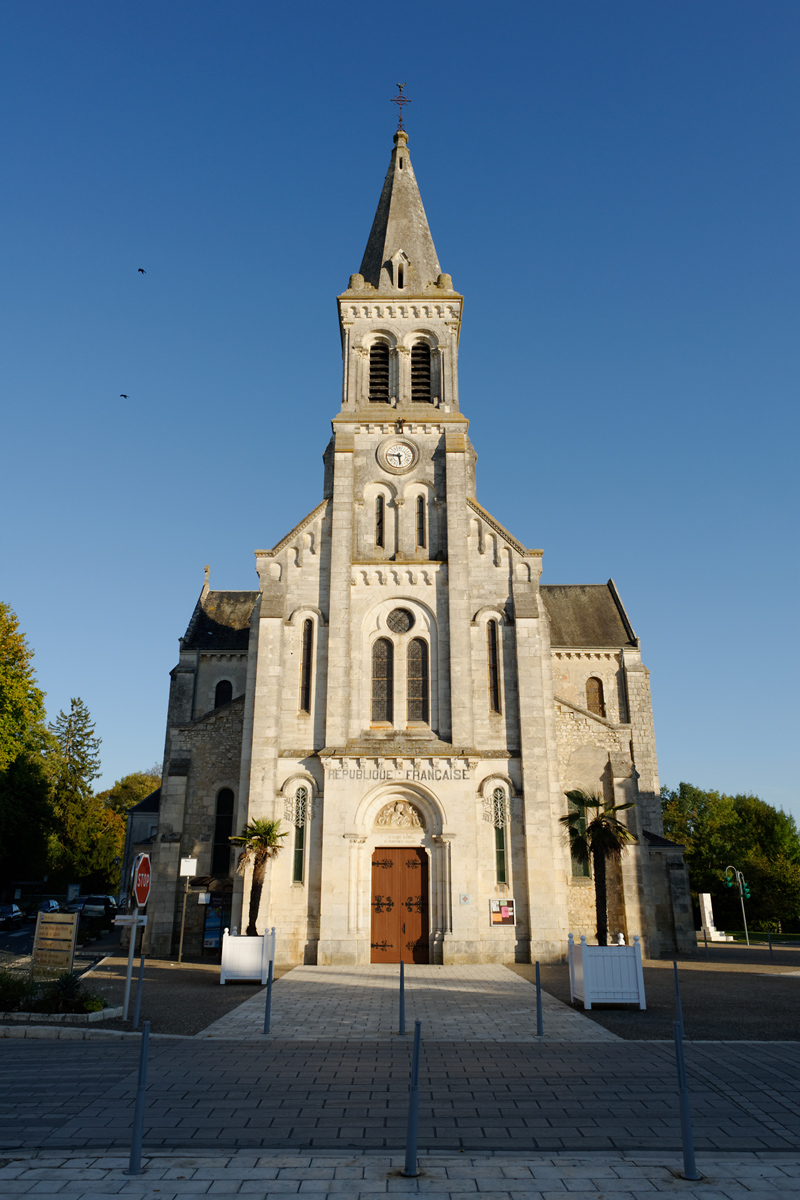
- The Church of Saint-Sébastien, in Villedieu-sur-Indre

- Coat of arms
- Location of Villedieu-sur-Indre
- Location within France Location within Centre-Val de Loire
- Coordinates: 46°50′50″N 1°32′27″E
- Country: France
- Region: Centre-Val de Loire
- Department: Indre
- Arrondissement: Châteauroux
- Canton: Buzançais
- Intercommunality: Val de l'Indre-Brenne

Government
  - Mayor (2020–2026): Xavier Elbaz
- Area^{1}: 57.77 km^{2} (22.31 sq mi)
- Elevation: 126 m (413 ft)
- Highest elevation: 163 m (535 ft)
- Lowest elevation: 110 m (360 ft)
- Population (2023): 2,583
  - Density: 44.71/km^{2} (115.8/sq mi)
- Time zone: UTC+01:00 (CET)
  - Summer (DST): UTC+02:00 (CEST)
- INSEE/Postal code: 36241 /36320
- ^{1} French Land Register data, which excludes lakes, ponds, glaciers > 1 km^{2} (0.386 sq mi or 247 acres) and river estuaries.

Villedieu-sur-Indre (French pronunciation: [vildjø syʁ ɛ̃dʁ], literally Villedieu on Indre) is a commune in the Indre department in central France.

== Population ==
Historical population

Year	Pop.	±% p.a.
1793	750	—
1800	566	−3.94%
1806	770	+5.26%
1821	987	+1.67%
1831	2,233	+8.51%
1836	2,358	+1.10%
1841	2,450	+0.77%
1846	2,207	−2.07%
1851	2,443	+2.05%
1856	2,244	−1.68%
1861	2,264	+0.18%
1866	2,433	+1.45%
1872	2,310	−0.86%
1876	2,627	+3.27%
1881	2,672	+0.34%
1886	2,694	+0.16%
1891	2,648	−0.34%
1896	2,721	+0.55%
1901	2,816	+0.69%

Year	Pop.	±% p.a.
1906	3,063	+1.70%
1911	3,243	+1.15%
1921	2,883	−1.17%
1926	2,832	−0.36%
1931	2,513	−2.36%
1936	2,547	+0.27%
1946	2,540	−0.03%
1954	2,574	+0.17%
1962	2,440	−0.67%
1968	2,326	−0.79%
1975	2,294	−0.20%
1982	2,276	−0.11%
1990	2,158	−0.66%
1999	2,340	+0.90%
2007	2,716	+1.88%
2012	2,755	+0.29%
2017	2,697	−0.42%
2023	2,583	−0.72%

Source: EHESS and INSEE (1968-2023)

== See also ==
- Communes of the Indre department
