= Le Tranger =

- Commune
- Location of Le Tranger
- Location within France Location within Centre-Val de Loire
- Coordinates: 46°57′28″N 1°14′28″E
- Country: France
- Region: Centre-Val de Loire
- Department: Indre
- Arrondissement: Châteauroux
- Canton: Buzançais

Government
  - Mayor (2021–2026): Alexandra Beauvais-Matthey
- Area^{1}: 22.26 km^{2} (8.59 sq mi)
- Elevation: 93 m (305 ft)
- Highest elevation: 184 m (604 ft)
- Lowest elevation: 86 m (282 ft)
- Population (2023): 166
  - Density: 7.46/km^{2} (19.3/sq mi)
- Time zone: UTC+01:00 (CET)
  - Summer (DST): UTC+02:00 (CEST)
- INSEE/Postal code: 36225 /36700
- ^{1} French Land Register data, which excludes lakes, ponds, glaciers > 1 km^{2} (0.386 sq mi or 247 acres) and river estuaries.

Le Tranger is a commune in the Indre department in central France.

== Population ==
Historical population
Year	Pop.	±% p.a.
1968	299	—
1975	240	−3.09%
1982	225	−0.92%
1990	191	−2.03%
1999	162	−1.81%
2007	181	+1.40%
2012	163	−2.07%
2017	176	+1.55%
2023	166	−0.97%
Source: INSEE

== See also ==
- Communes of the Indre department
