= Saint-Maur, Indre =

Saint-Maur
- Commune
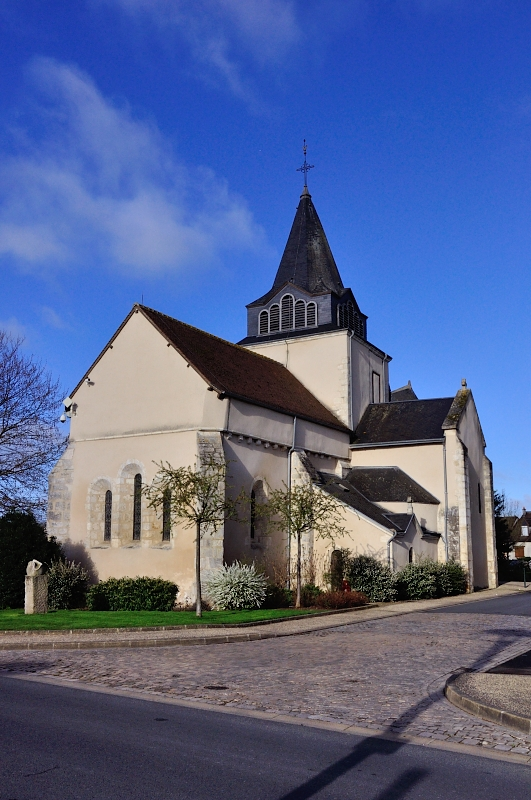
- The church in Saint-Maur
- Location of Saint-Maur
- Location within France Location within Centre-Val de Loire
- Coordinates: 46°48′27″N 1°38′24″E
- Country: France
- Region: Centre-Val de Loire
- Department: Indre
- Arrondissement: Châteauroux
- Canton: Buzançais, Levroux
- Intercommunality: CA Châteauroux Métropole

Government
  - Mayor (2021–2026): Ludovic Réau
- Area^{1}: 87.91 km^{2} (33.94 sq mi)
- Elevation: 154 m (505 ft)
- Highest elevation: 184 m (604 ft)
- Lowest elevation: 127 m (417 ft)
- Population (2023): 3,537
  - Density: 40.23/km^{2} (104.2/sq mi)
- Time zone: UTC+01:00 (CET)
  - Summer (DST): UTC+02:00 (CEST)
- INSEE/Postal code: 36202 /36250
- ^{1} French Land Register data, which excludes lakes, ponds, glaciers > 1 km^{2} (0.386 sq mi or 247 acres) and river estuaries.

Saint-Maur (French pronunciation: [sɛ̃ mɔʁ]) is a commune in the Indre department in central France. On 1 January 2016, the former commune of Villers-les-Ormes was merged into Saint-Maur.

== Population ==
Historical population
Year	Pop.	±% p.a.
1968	2,138	—
1975	2,880	+4.35%
1982	3,793	+4.01%
1990	3,938	+0.47%
1999	3,678	−0.76%
2007	3,795	+0.39%
2012	3,519	−1.50%
2017	3,642	+0.69%
2023	3,537	−0.49%
Populations of the area corresponding with the commune of Saint-Maur at 1 January 2025. Source: INSEE

== See also ==
- Communes of the Indre department
