= Chezelles, Indre =

Chezelles
- Commune
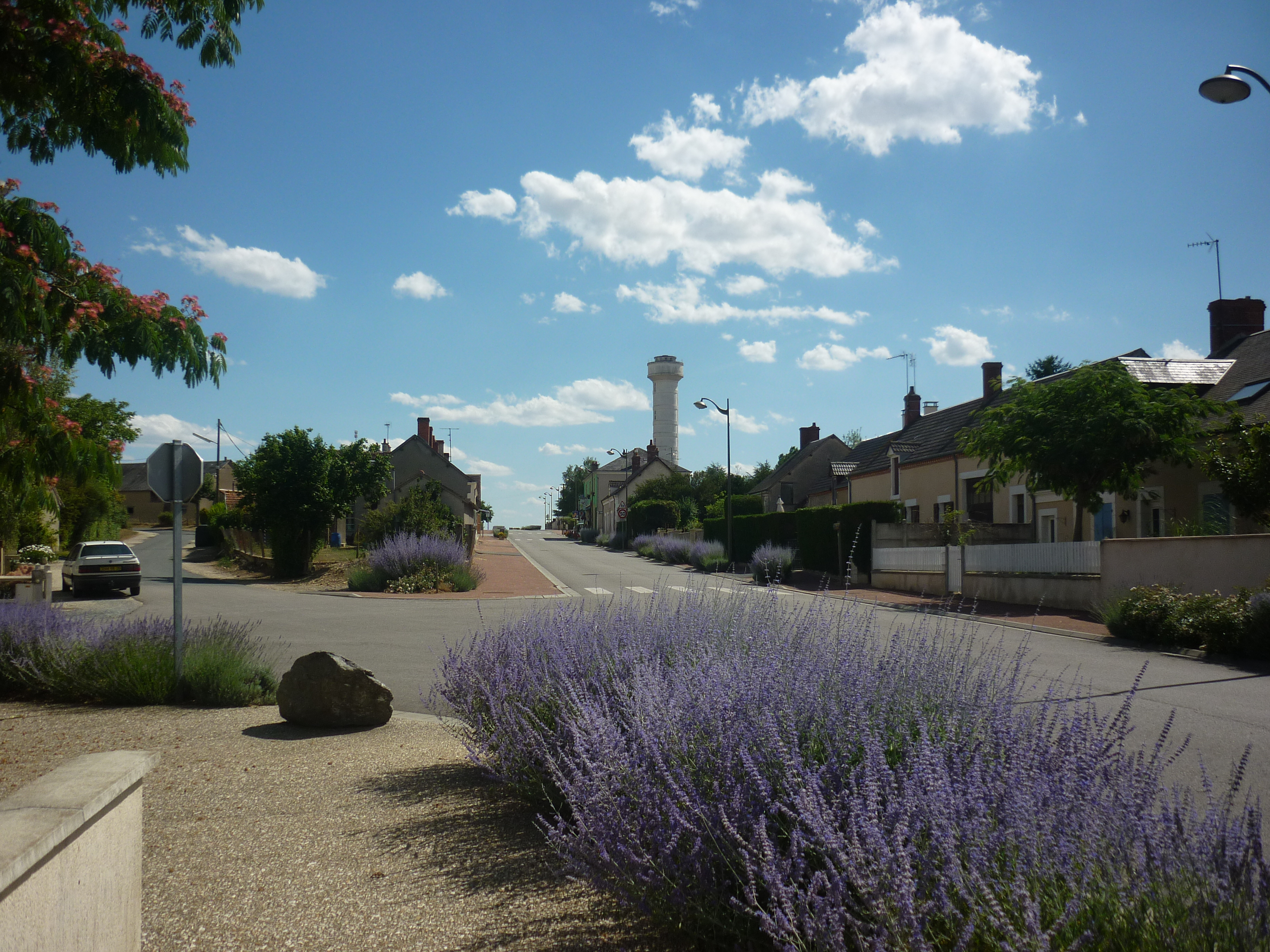
- The well-kept village of Chezelles
- Location of Chezelles
- Location within France Location within Centre-Val de Loire
- Coordinates: 46°53′27″N 1°34′35″E
- Country: France
- Region: Centre-Val de Loire
- Department: Indre
- Arrondissement: Châteauroux
- Canton: Buzançais
- Intercommunality: Val de l'Indre-Brenne

Government
  - Mayor (2020–2026): Philippe Yvon
- Area^{1}: 17.32 km^{2} (6.69 sq mi)
- Elevation: 163 m (535 ft)
- Highest elevation: 171 m (561 ft)
- Lowest elevation: 132 m (433 ft)
- Population (2023): 452
  - Density: 26.1/km^{2} (67.6/sq mi)
- Time zone: UTC+01:00 (CET)
  - Summer (DST): UTC+02:00 (CEST)
- INSEE/Postal code: 36050 /36500
- ^{1} French Land Register data, which excludes lakes, ponds, glaciers > 1 km^{2} (0.386 sq mi or 247 acres) and river estuaries.

Chezelles (French pronunciation: [ʃəzɛl]) is a commune in the Indre department in central France.

== Population ==
Historical population
Year	Pop.	±% p.a.
1968	419	—
1975	381	−1.35%
1982	379	−0.08%
1990	402	+0.74%
1999	409	+0.19%
2007	398	−0.34%
2012	450	+2.49%
2017	476	+1.13%
2023	452	−0.86%
Source: INSEE

== See also ==
- Communes of the Indre department
