= Saint-Médard, Indre =

Saint-Médard
- Commune
- Location of Saint-Médard
- Location within France Location within Centre-Val de Loire
- Coordinates: 47°00′02″N 1°14′51″E
- Country: France
- Region: Centre-Val de Loire
- Department: Indre
- Arrondissement: Châteauroux
- Canton: Buzançais

Government
  - Mayor (2020–2026): Alain Jacquet
- Area^{1}: 12.6 km^{2} (4.9 sq mi)
- Elevation: 140 m (460 ft)
- Highest elevation: 174 m (571 ft)
- Lowest elevation: 108 m (354 ft)
- Population (2023): 63
  - Density: 5.0/km^{2} (13/sq mi)
- Time zone: UTC+01:00 (CET)
  - Summer (DST): UTC+02:00 (CEST)
- INSEE/Postal code: 36203 /36700
- ^{1} French Land Register data, which excludes lakes, ponds, glaciers > 1 km^{2} (0.386 sq mi or 247 acres) and river estuaries.

Saint-Médard (French pronunciation: [sɛ̃ medaʁ]) is a commune in the Indre department in central France.

== Population ==
Historical population
| Year | Pop. | ±% p.a. |
|---|---|---|
| 1968 | 105 | — |
| 1975 | 101 | −0.55% |
| 1982 | 90 | −1.63% |
| 1990 | 84 | −0.86% |
| 1999 | 73 | −1.55% |
| 2007 | 43 | −6.40% |
| 2012 | 42 | −0.47% |
| 2017 | 48 | +2.71% |
| 2023 | 63 | +4.64% |
Source: INSEE

== See also ==
- Communes of the Indre department
