= Murs, Indre =

Murs
- Commune
- Location of Murs
- Location within France Location within Centre-Val de Loire
- Coordinates: 46°54′54″N 1°09′43″E
- Country: France
- Region: Centre-Val de Loire
- Department: Indre
- Arrondissement: Châteauroux
- Canton: Buzançais

Government
  - Mayor (2020–2026): Jacques Charlot
- Area^{1}: 23.05 km^{2} (8.90 sq mi)
- Elevation: 90 m (300 ft)
- Highest elevation: 150 m (490 ft)
- Lowest elevation: 106 m (348 ft)
- Population (2023): 119
  - Density: 5.16/km^{2} (13.4/sq mi)
- Time zone: UTC+01:00 (CET)
  - Summer (DST): UTC+02:00 (CEST)
- INSEE/Postal code: 36136 /36700
- ^{1} French Land Register data, which excludes lakes, ponds, glaciers > 1 km^{2} (0.386 sq mi or 247 acres) and river estuaries.

Murs is a commune in the Indre department in central France.

== Population ==
Historical population
Year	Pop.	±% p.a.
1968	260	—
1975	226	−1.98%
1982	184	−2.89%
1990	150	−2.52%
1999	137	−1.00%
2007	124	−1.24%
2012	134	+1.56%
2017	127	−1.07%
2023	119	−1.08%
Source: INSEE

== See also ==
- Communes of the Indre department
