= Saint-Genou =

- Commune
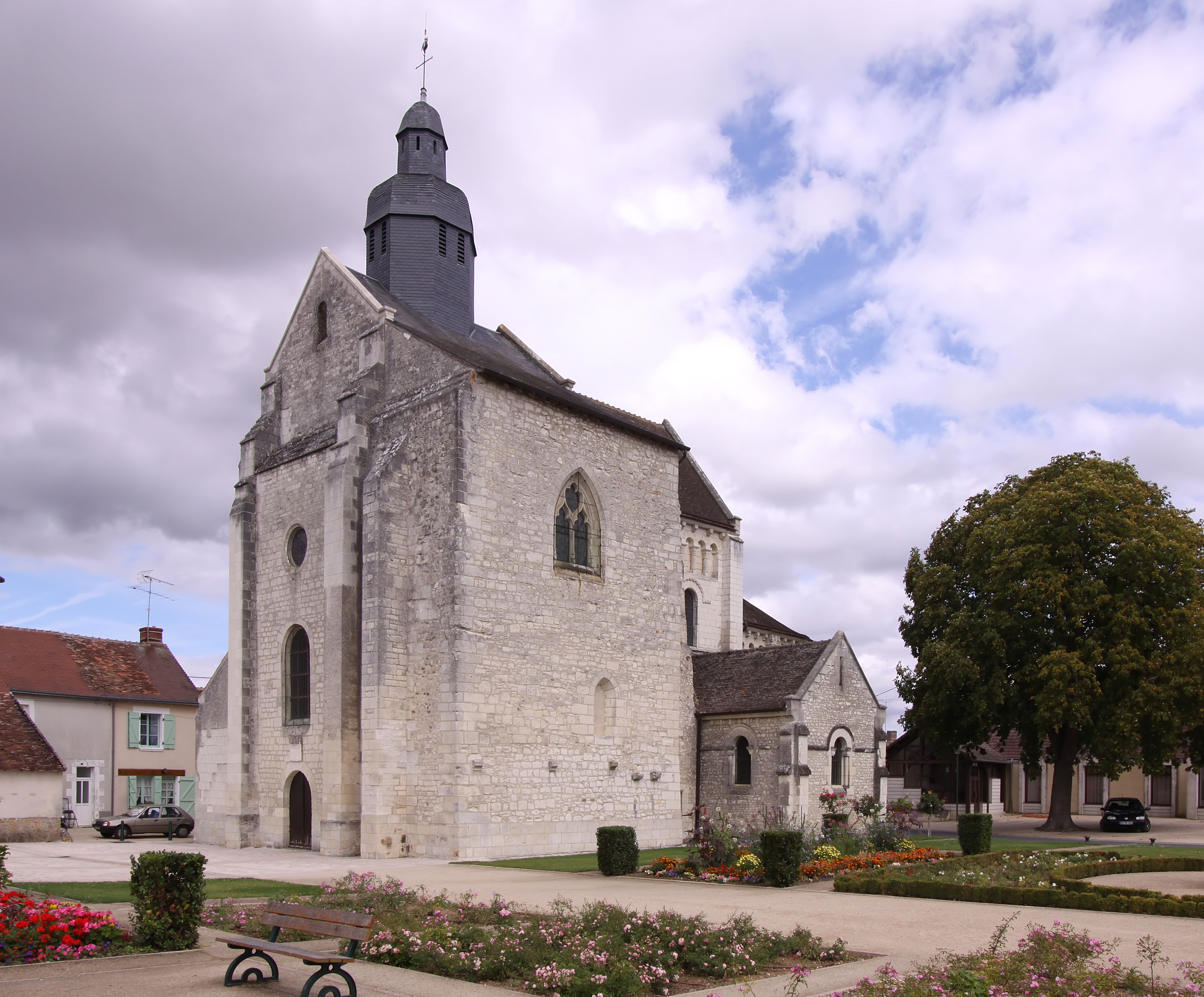
- The Abbey of Saint-Genou, in Saint-Genou
- Location of Saint-Genou
- Location within France Location within Centre-Val de Loire
- Coordinates: 46°55′49″N 1°20′20″E
- Country: France
- Region: Centre-Val de Loire
- Department: Indre
- Arrondissement: Châteauroux
- Canton: Buzançais
- Intercommunality: Val de l'Indre-Brenne

Government
  - Mayor (2020–2026): Roger Chevreton
- Area^{1}: 24.43 km^{2} (9.43 sq mi)
- Elevation: 105 m (344 ft)
- Highest elevation: 167 m (548 ft)
- Lowest elevation: 97 m (318 ft)
- Population (2023): 911
  - Density: 37.3/km^{2} (96.6/sq mi)
- Demonym(s): Genulphien, Genulphienne
- Time zone: UTC+01:00 (CET)
  - Summer (DST): UTC+02:00 (CEST)
- INSEE/Postal code: 36194 /36500
- ^{1} French Land Register data, which excludes lakes, ponds, glaciers > 1 km^{2} (0.386 sq mi or 247 acres) and river estuaries.

Saint-Genou (French pronunciation: [sɛ̃ ʒənu], [sɛ̃ ʒnu]) is a commune in the French department of Indre, Centre-Val de Loire, central France.

== Population ==
Historical population
| Year | Pop. | ±% p.a. |
|---|---|---|
| 1968 | 1,290 | — |
| 1975 | 1,205 | −0.97% |
| 1982 | 1,101 | −1.28% |
| 1990 | 1,065 | −0.41% |
| 1999 | 1,039 | −0.27% |
| 2007 | 1,001 | −0.46% |
| 2012 | 1,007 | +0.12% |
| 2017 | 971 | −0.73% |
| 2023 | 911 | −1.06% |
Source: INSEE

== See also ==
- Communes of the Indre department
