= Arrondissement of Châteauroux =

Coordinates: 46°48′N 1°41′E

- Arrondissement
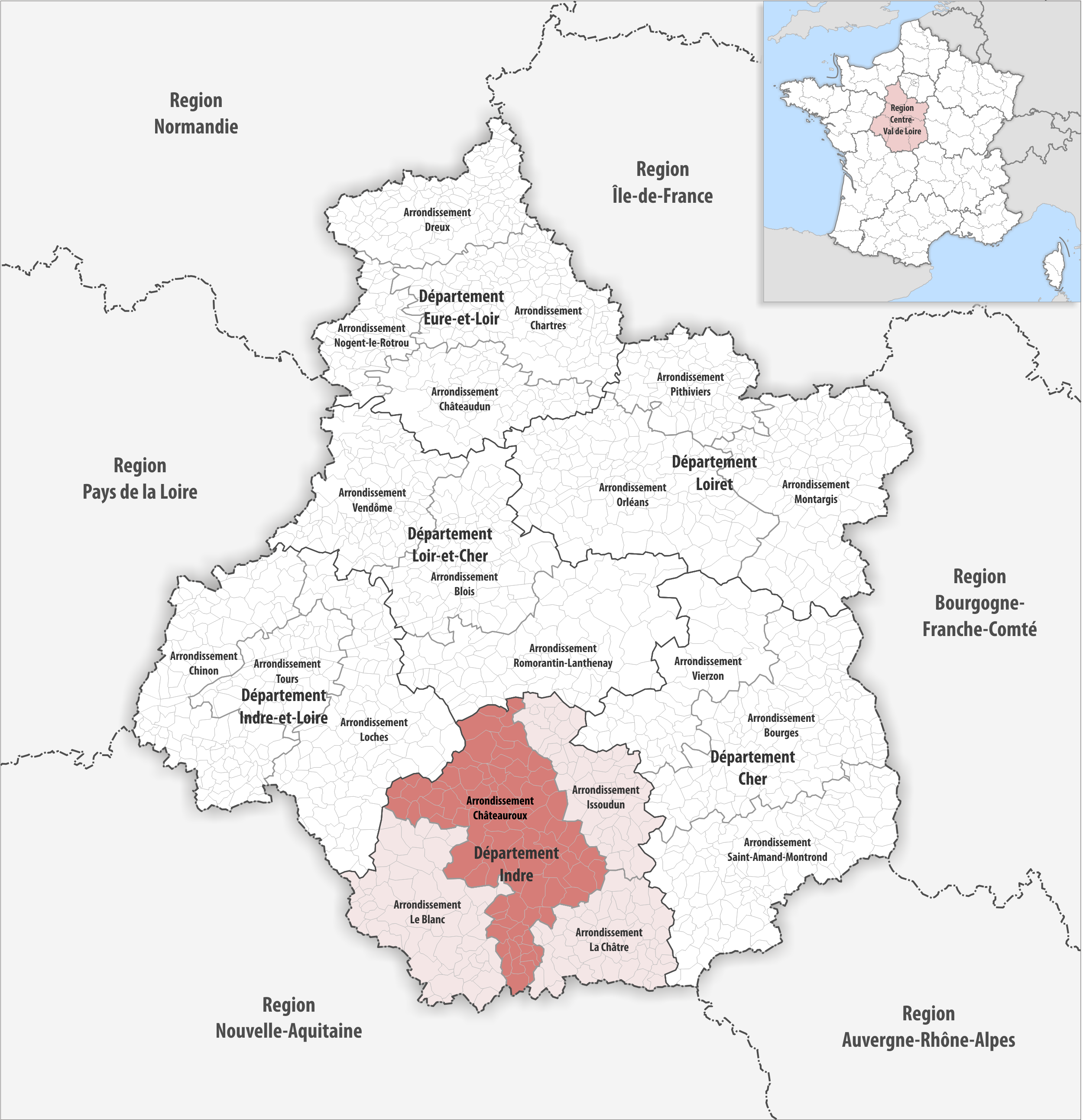
- Location within the region Centre-Val de Loire
- Country: France
- Region: Centre-Val de Loire
- Department: Indre
- No. of communes: {{{nbcomm}}}
- Area: 2,621.9 km^{2} (1,012.3 sq mi)
- Population (2023): 125,603
  - Density: 47.905/km^{2} (124.07/sq mi)
- INSEE code: 362

The arrondissement of Châteauroux (French: arrondissement de Châteauroux [aʁɔ̃dismɑ̃ d(ə) ʃɑtoʁu]) is a district (arrondissement) of France in the Indre department in the administrative region of Centre-Val de Loire. It has 84 communes. Its population is 126,377 (2021), and its area is 2,621.9 km^{2} (1,012.3 sq mi).

== Composition ==
The communes of the arrondissement of Châteauroux, and their INSEE codes, are:

1. Ardentes (36005)
2. Argenton-sur-Creuse (36006)
3. Argy (36007)
4. Arpheuilles (36008)
5. Arthon (36009)
6. Badecon-le-Pin (36158)
7. Baraize (36012)
8. Baudres (36013)
9. Bazaiges (36014)
10. Bouesse (36022)
11. Bouges-le-Château (36023)
12. Bretagne (36024)
13. Brion (36026)
14. Buzançais (36031)
15. Ceaulmont (36032)
16. Celon (36033)
17. La Chapelle-Orthemale (36040)
18. Chasseneuil (36042)
19. Châteauroux (36044)
20. Châtillon-sur-Indre (36045)
21. Chavin (36048)
22. Chezelles (36050)
23. Cléré-du-Bois (36054)
24. Clion (36055)
25. Coings (36057)
26. Cuzion (36062)
27. Déols (36063)
28. Diors (36064)
29. Écueillé (36069)
30. Éguzon-Chantôme (36070)
31. Étrechet (36071)
32. Fléré-la-Rivière (36074)
33. Fontguenand (36077)
34. Francillon (36079)
35. Frédille (36080)
36. Gargilesse-Dampierre (36081)
37. Gehée (36082)
38. Heugnes (36086)
39. Jeu-les-Bois (36089)
40. Jeu-Maloches (36090)
41. Langé (36092)
42. Levroux (36093)
43. Luant (36101)
44. Luçay-le-Mâle (36103)
45. Lye (36107)
46. Mâron (36112)
47. Le Menoux (36117)
48. Méobecq (36118)
49. Montierchaume (36128)
50. Mosnay (36131)
51. Moulins-sur-Céphons (36135)
52. Murs (36136)
53. Neuillay-les-Bois (36139)
54. Niherne (36142)
55. Palluau-sur-Indre (36149)
56. Le Pêchereau (36154)
57. Pellevoisin (36155)
58. Le Poinçonnet (36159)
59. Pommiers (36160)
60. Le Pont-Chrétien-Chabenet (36161)
61. Préaux (36166)
62. Rouvres-les-Bois (36175)
63. Saint-Cyran-du-Jambot (36188)
64. Saint-Genou (36194)
65. Saint-Lactencin (36198)
66. Saint-Marcel (36200)
67. Saint-Maur (36202)
68. Saint-Médard (36203)
69. Sassierges-Saint-Germain (36211)
70. Selles-sur-Nahon (36216)
71. Sougé (36218)
72. Tendu (36219)
73. Le Tranger (36225)
74. Valençay (36228)
75. Velles (36231)
76. Vendœuvres (36232)
77. La Vernelle (36233)
78. Veuil (36235)
79. Vicq-sur-Nahon (36237)
80. Villedieu-sur-Indre (36241)
81. Villegongis (36242)
82. Villegouin (36243)
83. Villentrois-Faverolles-en-Berry (36244)
84. Vineuil (36247)

== History ==
The arrondissement of Châteauroux was created in 1800. At the January 2017 reorganisation of the arrondissements of Indre, it gained eight communes from the arrondissement of La Châtre, and it lost one commune to the arrondissement of Le Blanc and one commune to the arrondissement of La Châtre.

As a result of the reorganisation of the cantons of France which came into effect in 2015, the borders of the cantons are no longer related to the borders of the arrondissements. The cantons of the arrondissement of Châteauroux were, as of January 2015:

1. Ardentes
2. Argenton-sur-Creuse
3. Buzançais
4. Châteauroux-Centre
5. Châteauroux-Est
6. Châteauroux-Ouest
7. Châteauroux-Sud
8. Châtillon-sur-Indre
9. Écueillé
10. Levroux
11. Valençay
