= Cléré-du-Bois =

- Commune
- Location of Cléré-du-Bois
- Location within France Location within Centre-Val de Loire
- Coordinates: 46°55′27″N 1°06′10″E
- Country: France
- Region: Centre-Val de Loire
- Department: Indre
- Arrondissement: Châteauroux
- Canton: Buzançais

Government
  - Mayor (2020–2026): Alain Bourin
- Area^{1}: 36.13 km^{2} (13.95 sq mi)
- Elevation: 132 m (433 ft)
- Highest elevation: 147 m (482 ft)
- Lowest elevation: 95 m (312 ft)
- Population (2023): 239
  - Density: 6.62/km^{2} (17.1/sq mi)
- Time zone: UTC+01:00 (CET)
  - Summer (DST): UTC+02:00 (CEST)
- INSEE/Postal code: 36054 /36700
- ^{1} French Land Register data, which excludes lakes, ponds, glaciers > 1 km^{2} (0.386 sq mi or 247 acres) and river estuaries.

Cléré-du-Bois (French pronunciation: [kleʁe dy bwa]) is a commune in the Indre department in central France.

== Population ==
Historical population
Year	Pop.	±% p.a.
1968	547	—
1975	434	−3.25%
1982	373	−2.14%
1990	298	−2.77%
1999	267	−1.21%
2007	291	+1.08%
2012	276	−1.05%
2017	246	−2.28%
2023	239	−0.48%
Source: INSEE

== See also ==
- Communes of the Indre department
