= La Chapelle-Orthemale =

- Commune
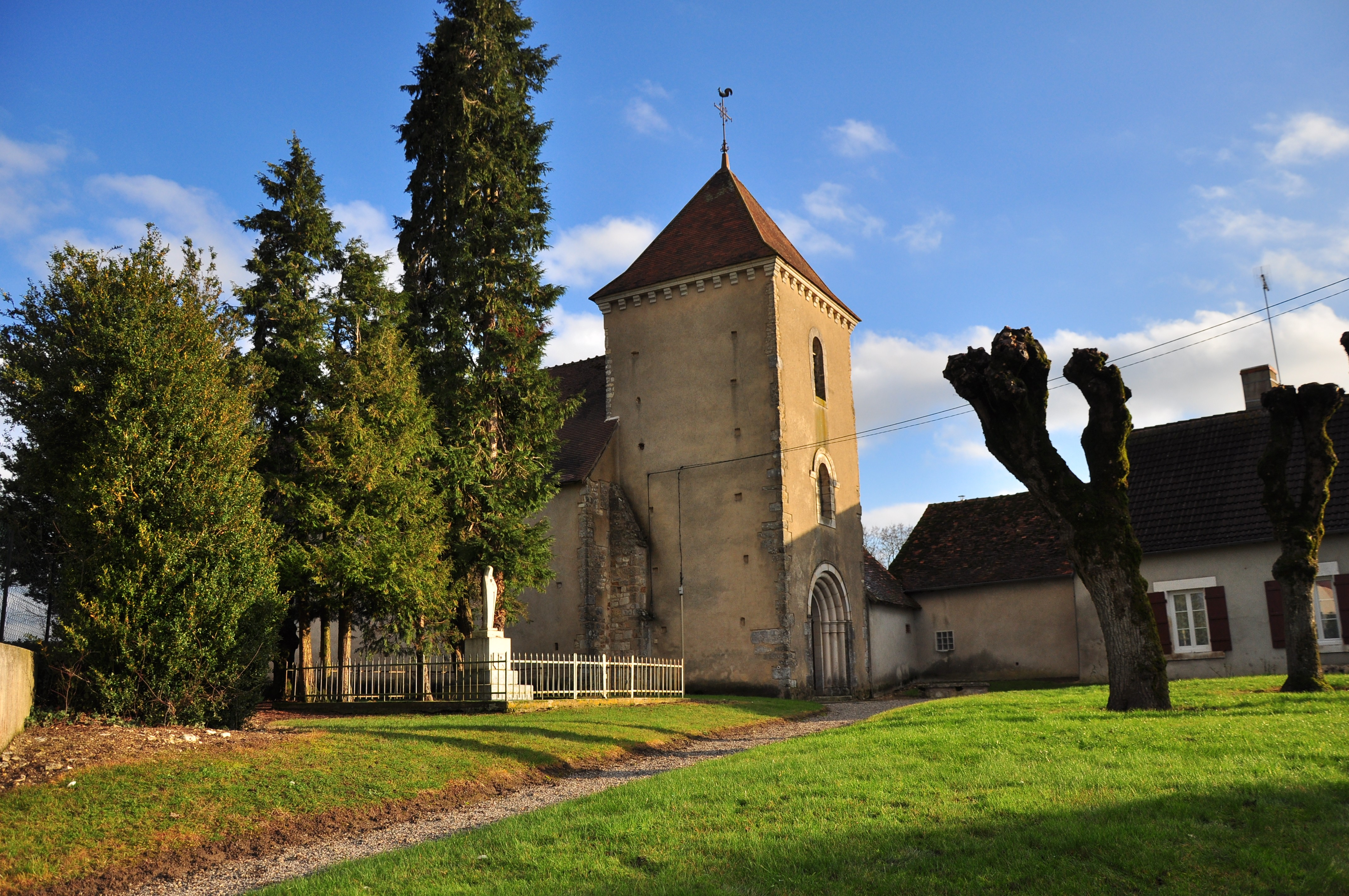
- The church in La Chapelle-Orthemale
- Location of La Chapelle-Orthemale
- Location within France Location within Centre-Val de Loire
- Coordinates: 46°50′38″N 1°27′10″E
- Country: France
- Region: Centre-Val de Loire
- Department: Indre
- Arrondissement: Châteauroux
- Canton: Buzançais
- Intercommunality: Val de l'Indre-Brenne

Government
  - Mayor (2020–2026): Christophe Morin
- Area^{1}: 16.8 km^{2} (6.5 sq mi)
- Elevation: 150 m (490 ft)
- Highest elevation: 151 m (495 ft)
- Lowest elevation: 111 m (364 ft)
- Population (2023): 100
  - Density: 6.0/km^{2} (15/sq mi)
- Time zone: UTC+01:00 (CET)
  - Summer (DST): UTC+02:00 (CEST)
- INSEE/Postal code: 36040 /36500
- ^{1} French Land Register data, which excludes lakes, ponds, glaciers > 1 km^{2} (0.386 sq mi or 247 acres) and river estuaries.

La Chapelle-Orthemale (French pronunciation: [la ʃapel ɔʁtəmal]) is a commune in the Indre department in central France.

== Population ==
Historical population
Year	Pop.	±% p.a.
1968	154	—
1975	141	−1.25%
1982	115	−2.87%
1990	109	−0.67%
1999	95	−1.52%
2007	118	+2.75%
2012	126	+1.32%
2017	111	−2.50%
2023	100	−1.72%
Source: INSEE

== See also ==
- Communes of the Indre department
