= Saint-Lactencin =

- Commune
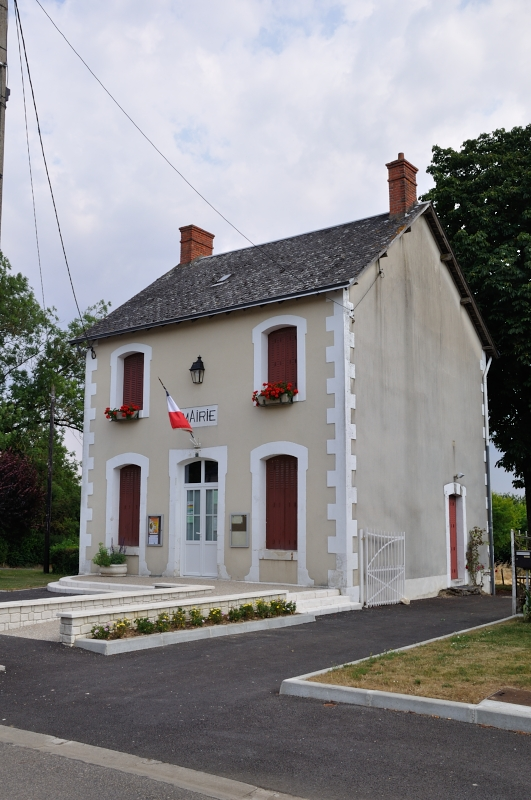
- The town hall in Saint-Lactencin
- Location of Saint-Lactencin
- Location within France Location within Centre-Val de Loire
- Coordinates: 46°53′56″N 1°29′38″E
- Country: France
- Region: Centre-Val de Loire
- Department: Indre
- Arrondissement: Châteauroux
- Canton: Buzançais
- Intercommunality: Val de l'Indre-Brenne

Government
  - Mayor (2020–2026): Thierry Logie
- Area^{1}: 32.2 km^{2} (12.4 sq mi)
- Elevation: 150 m (490 ft)
- Highest elevation: 182 m (597 ft)
- Lowest elevation: 116 m (381 ft)
- Population (2023): 405
  - Density: 12.6/km^{2} (32.6/sq mi)
- Time zone: UTC+01:00 (CET)
  - Summer (DST): UTC+02:00 (CEST)
- INSEE/Postal code: 36198 /36500
- ^{1} French Land Register data, which excludes lakes, ponds, glaciers > 1 km^{2} (0.386 sq mi or 247 acres) and river estuaries.

Saint-Lactencin (French pronunciation: [sɛ̃ laktɑ̃sɛ̃]) is a commune in the Indre department, central France.

== Population ==
Historical population
Year	Pop.	±% p.a.
1968	389	—
1975	367	−0.83%
1982	366	−0.04%
1990	409	+1.40%
1999	353	−1.62%
2007	392	+1.32%
2012	412	+1.00%
2017	423	+0.53%
2023	405	−0.72%
Source: INSEE

== See also ==
- Communes of the Indre department
