= Argy =

- Commune
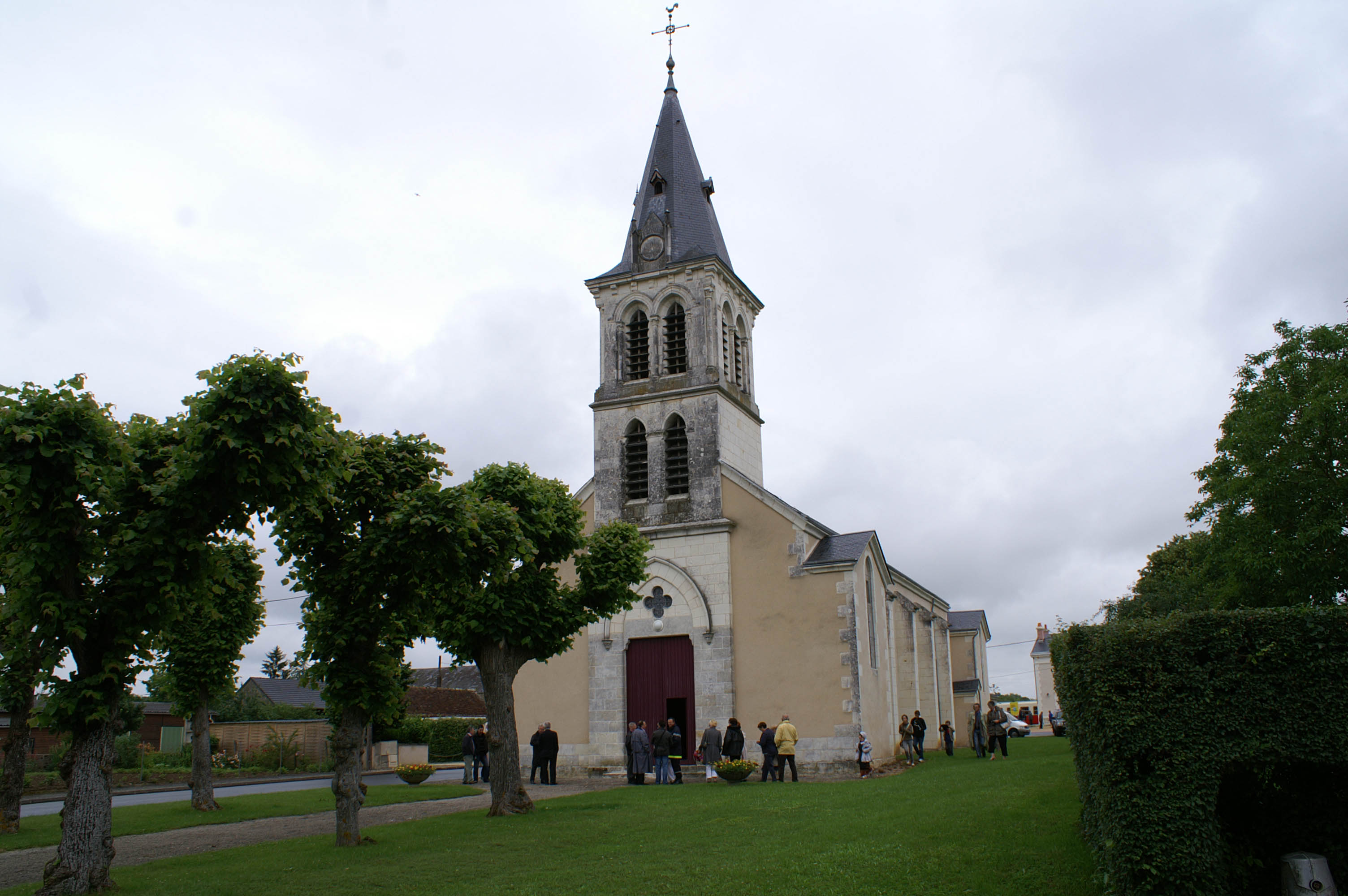
- The church in Argy
- Location of Argy
- Location within France Location within Centre-Val de Loire
- Coordinates: 46°56′23″N 1°26′21″E
- Country: France
- Region: Centre-Val de Loire
- Department: Indre
- Arrondissement: Châteauroux
- Canton: Buzançais
- Intercommunality: CC Val Indre - Brenne

Government
  - Mayor (2020–2026): Bernadette Bonnin-Villemont
- Area^{1}: 38.89 km^{2} (15.02 sq mi)
- Elevation: 119 m (390 ft)
- Highest elevation: 182 m (597 ft)
- Lowest elevation: 106 m (348 ft)
- Population (2023): 559
  - Density: 14.4/km^{2} (37.2/sq mi)
- Demonym: Argycien·ne
- Time zone: UTC+01:00 (CET)
  - Summer (DST): UTC+02:00 (CEST)
- INSEE/Postal code: 36007 /36500
- ^{1} French Land Register data, which excludes lakes, ponds, glaciers > 1 km^{2} (0.386 sq mi or 247 acres) and river estuaries.

Argy (French pronunciation: [aʁʒi]) is a commune in the department of Indre and the region of Centre-Val de Loire, France.

== Population ==
Historical population
Year	Pop.	±% p.a.
1968	912	—
1975	796	−1.92%
1982	687	−2.08%
1990	663	−0.44%
1999	614	−0.85%
2007	611	−0.06%
2012	625	+0.45%
2017	603	−0.71%
2023	559	−1.25%
Source: INSEE

== See also ==
- Communes of the Indre department
