= Arpheuilles, Indre =

Arpheuilles
- Commune
- Location of Arpheuilles
- Location within France Location within Centre-Val de Loire
- Coordinates: 46°54′03″N 1°16′42″E
- Country: France
- Region: Centre-Val de Loire
- Department: Indre
- Arrondissement: Châteauroux
- Canton: Buzançais
- Intercommunality: CC Châtillonnais Berry

Government
  - Mayor (2020–2026): Alain Bonac
- Area^{1}: 22.49 km^{2} (8.68 sq mi)
- Elevation: 111 m (364 ft)
- Highest elevation: 143 m (469 ft)
- Lowest elevation: 93 m (305 ft)
- Population (2023): 240
  - Density: 11/km^{2} (28/sq mi)
- Time zone: UTC+01:00 (CET)
  - Summer (DST): UTC+02:00 (CEST)
- INSEE/Postal code: 36008 /36700
- ^{1} French Land Register data, which excludes lakes, ponds, glaciers > 1 km^{2} (0.386 sq mi or 247 acres) and river estuaries.

Arpheuilles (French pronunciation: [aʁfœj]) is a commune in the Indre department in central France.

== Population ==
Historical population
Year	Pop.	±% p.a.
1968	478	—
1975	405	−2.34%
1982	287	−4.80%
1990	273	−0.62%
1999	253	−0.84%
2007	252	−0.05%
2012	229	−1.90%
2017	223	−0.53%
2023	240	+1.23%
Source: INSEE

== See also ==
- Communes of the Indre department
