= Sougé, Indre =

Sougé
- Commune
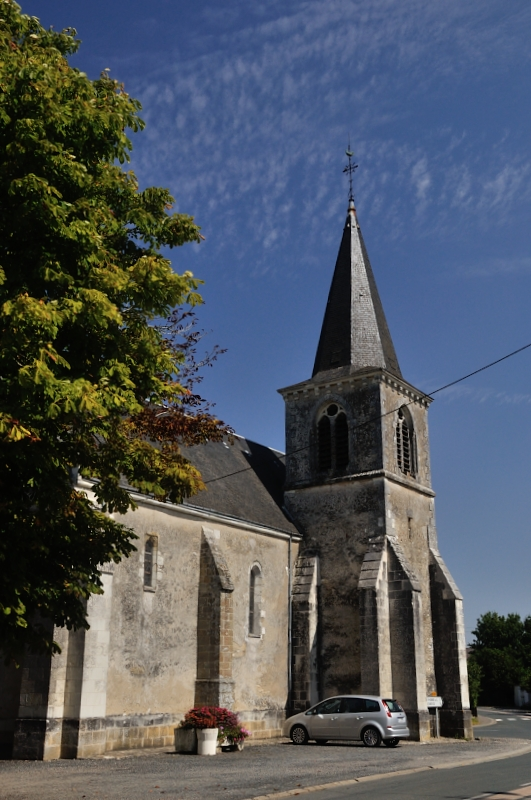
- The church of Saint-Hilaire, in Sougé
- Location of Sougé
- Location within France Location within Centre-Val de Loire
- Coordinates: 46°57′50″N 1°29′18″E
- Country: France
- Region: Centre-Val de Loire
- Department: Indre
- Arrondissement: Châteauroux
- Canton: Buzançais
- Intercommunality: Val de l'Indre-Brenne

Government
  - Mayor (2020–2026): Dominique Perrot
- Area^{1}: 13.02 km^{2} (5.03 sq mi)
- Elevation: 135 m (443 ft)
- Highest elevation: 170 m (560 ft)
- Lowest elevation: 120 m (390 ft)
- Population (2023): 140
  - Density: 11/km^{2} (28/sq mi)
- Time zone: UTC+01:00 (CET)
  - Summer (DST): UTC+02:00 (CEST)
- INSEE/Postal code: 36218 /36500
- ^{1} French Land Register data, which excludes lakes, ponds, glaciers > 1 km^{2} (0.386 sq mi or 247 acres) and river estuaries.

Sougé (French pronunciation: [suʒe]) is a commune in the Indre department, central France.

== Population ==
Historical population
| Year | Pop. | ±% p.a. |
|---|---|---|
| 1968 | 211 | — |
| 1975 | 216 | +0.34% |
| 1982 | 181 | −2.49% |
| 1990 | 170 | −0.78% |
| 1999 | 161 | −0.60% |
| 2007 | 163 | +0.15% |
| 2012 | 150 | −1.65% |
| 2017 | 143 | −0.95% |
| 2023 | 140 | −0.35% |
Source: INSEE

== See also ==
- Communes of the Indre department
