= Niherne =

- Commune
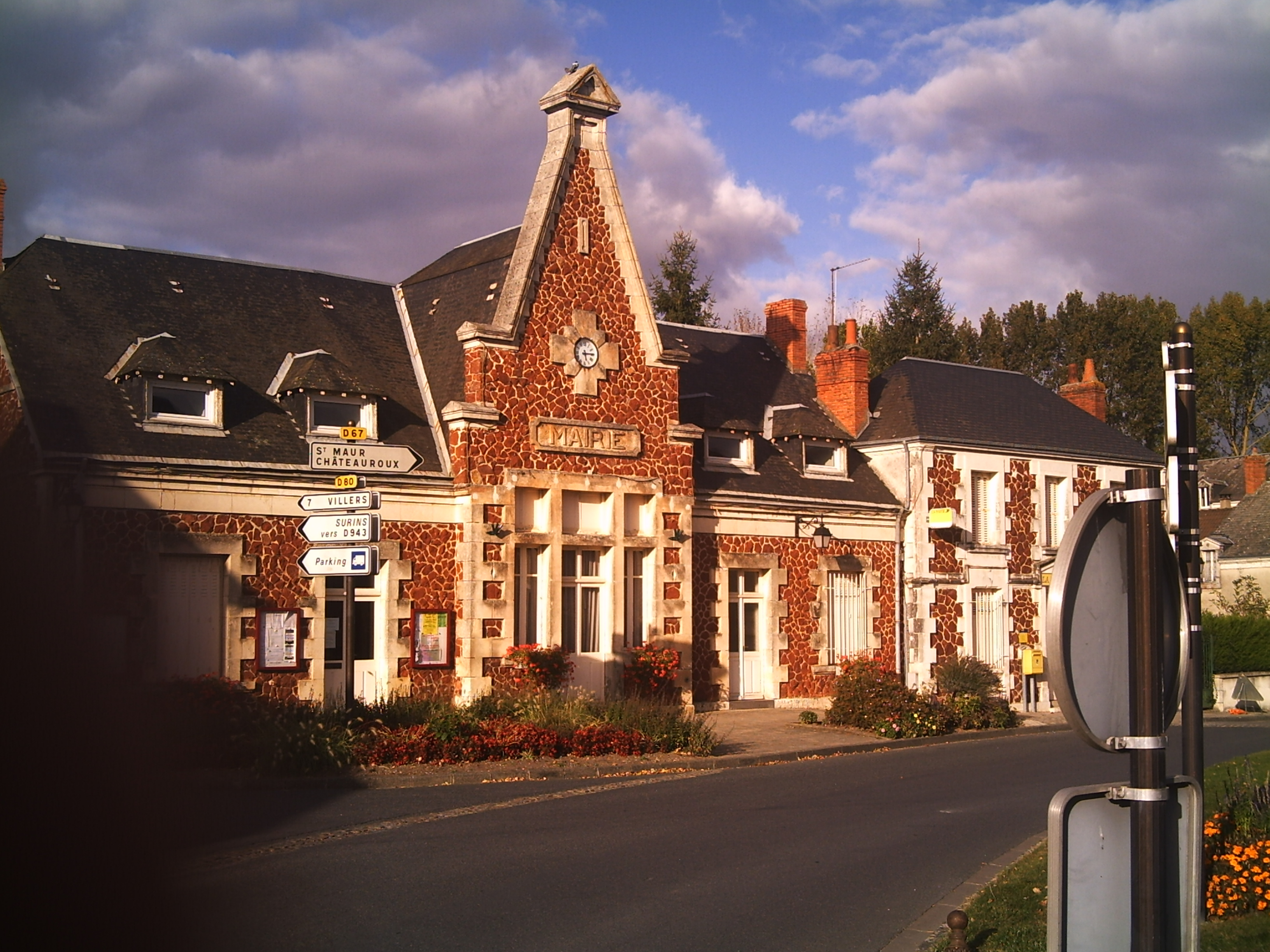
- The town hall in Niherne
- Location of Niherne
- Location within France Location within Centre-Val de Loire
- Coordinates: 46°49′45″N 1°33′55″E
- Country: France
- Region: Centre-Val de Loire
- Department: Indre
- Arrondissement: Châteauroux
- Canton: Buzançais
- Intercommunality: Val de l'Indre-Brenne

Government
  - Mayor (2020–2026): Bruno Mardelle
- Area^{1}: 42.87 km^{2} (16.55 sq mi)
- Elevation: 130 m (430 ft)
- Highest elevation: 163 m (535 ft)
- Lowest elevation: 122 m (400 ft)
- Population (2023): 1,444
  - Density: 33.68/km^{2} (87.24/sq mi)
- Time zone: UTC+01:00 (CET)
  - Summer (DST): UTC+02:00 (CEST)
- INSEE/Postal code: 36142 /36250
- ^{1} French Land Register data, which excludes lakes, ponds, glaciers > 1 km^{2} (0.386 sq mi or 247 acres) and river estuaries.

Niherne (French pronunciation: [ni.ɛʁn]) is a commune in the Indre department in central France.

== Population ==
Historical population
Year	Pop.	±% p.a.
1968	1,091	—
1975	1,103	+0.16%
1982	1,319	+2.59%
1990	1,504	+1.65%
1999	1,484	−0.15%
2007	1,562	+0.64%
2012	1,546	−0.21%
2017	1,586	+0.51%
2023	1,444	−1.55%
Source: INSEE

== See also ==
- Communes of the Indre department
