= Fléré-la-Rivière =

- Commune
- Location of Fléré-la-Rivière
- Location within France Location within Centre-Val de Loire
- Coordinates: 47°01′15″N 1°06′33″E
- Country: France
- Region: Centre-Val de Loire
- Department: Indre
- Arrondissement: Châteauroux
- Canton: Buzançais

Government
  - Mayor (2020–2026): Michel Braud
- Area^{1}: 25.31 km^{2} (9.77 sq mi)
- Elevation: 85 m (279 ft)
- Highest elevation: 142 m (466 ft)
- Lowest elevation: 79 m (259 ft)
- Population (2023): 560
  - Density: 22/km^{2} (57/sq mi)
- Time zone: UTC+01:00 (CET)
  - Summer (DST): UTC+02:00 (CEST)
- INSEE/Postal code: 36074 /36700
- ^{1} French Land Register data, which excludes lakes, ponds, glaciers > 1 km^{2} (0.386 sq mi or 247 acres) and river estuaries.

Fléré-la-Rivière (French pronunciation: [fleʁe la ʁivjɛʁ]) is a commune in the Indre department in central France.

== Population ==
Historical population
Year	Pop.	±% p.a.
1968	630	—
1975	557	−1.74%
1982	595	+0.95%
1990	628	+0.68%
1999	594	−0.62%
2007	602	+0.17%
2012	580	−0.74%
2017	552	−0.98%
2023	560	+0.24%
Source: INSEE

== See also ==
- Communes of the Indre department
