= Vendœuvres =

- Commune
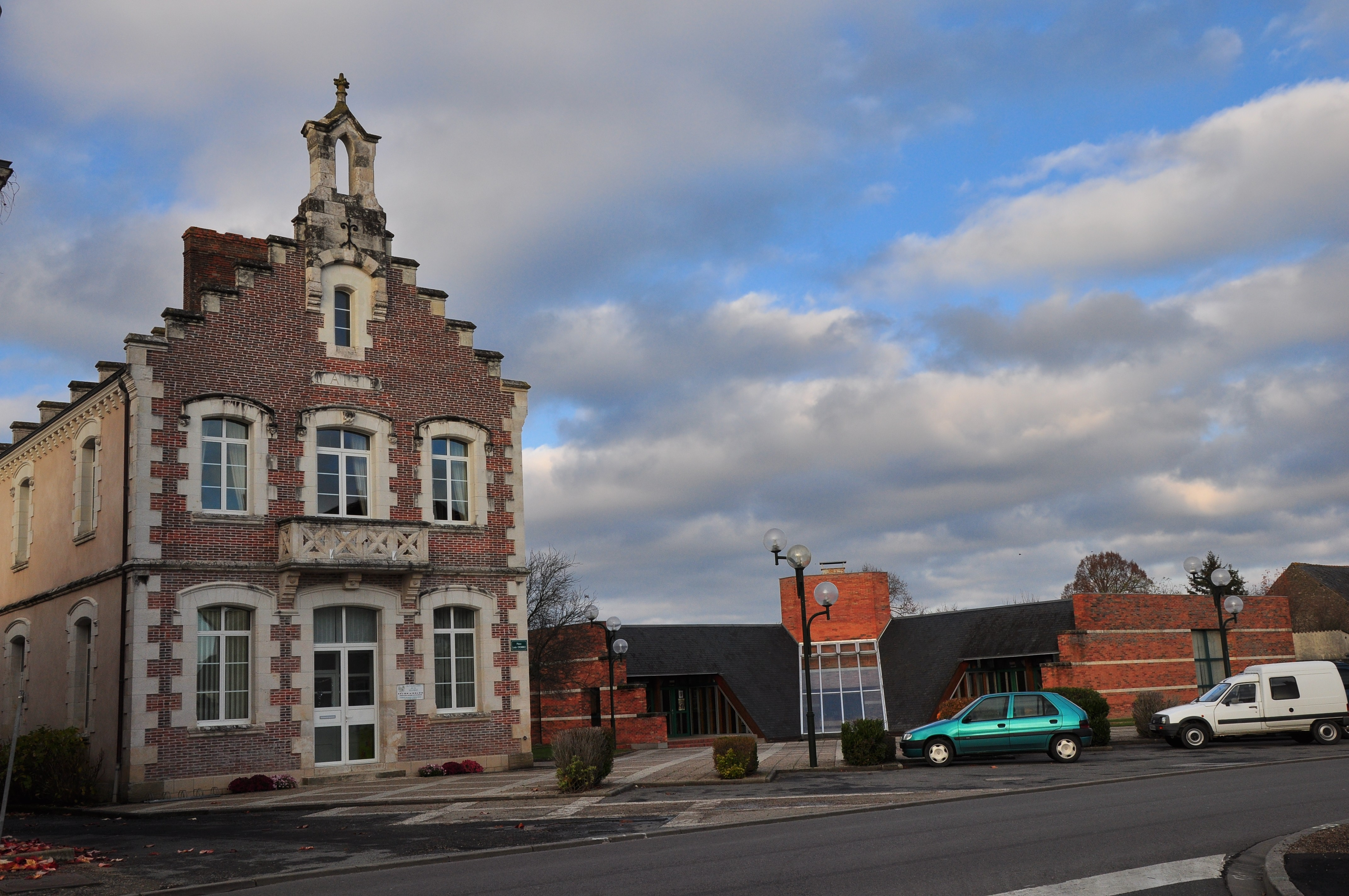
- The town hall in Vendœuvres
- Location of Vendœuvres
- Location within France Location within Centre-Val de Loire
- Coordinates: 46°48′09″N 1°21′33″E
- Country: France
- Region: Centre-Val de Loire
- Department: Indre
- Arrondissement: Châteauroux
- Canton: Saint-Gaultier
- Intercommunality: Val de l'Indre-Brenne

Government
  - Mayor (2020–2026): Christophe Vandaele
- Area^{1}: 96.45 km^{2} (37.24 sq mi)
- Elevation: 126 m (413 ft)
- Highest elevation: 139 m (456 ft)
- Lowest elevation: 97 m (318 ft)
- Population (2023): 1,086
  - Density: 11.26/km^{2} (29.16/sq mi)
- Time zone: UTC+01:00 (CET)
  - Summer (DST): UTC+02:00 (CEST)
- INSEE/Postal code: 36232 /36500
- ^{1} French Land Register data, which excludes lakes, ponds, glaciers > 1 km^{2} (0.386 sq mi or 247 acres) and river estuaries.

Vendœuvres (French pronunciation: [vɑ̃dœvʁ]) is a commune in the Indre department, central France.

== Geography ==
The commune is located in the parc naturel régional de la Brenne.

== Population ==
Historical population
Year	Pop.	±% p.a.
1968	1,183	—
1975	1,100	−1.03%
1982	1,022	−1.05%
1990	1,042	+0.24%
1999	1,018	−0.26%
2007	1,105	+1.03%
2012	1,143	+0.68%
2017	1,064	−1.42%
2023	1,086	+0.34%
Source: INSEE

== See also ==
- Communes of the Indre department
