= Canton of Buzançais =

Coordinates: 46.89°N 1.42°E

The Canton of Buzançais (French: canton de Buzançais, [kɑ̃tɔ̃ də byzɑ̃sɛ]) is an administrative division of the Indre department, central France. Its borders were modified at the French canton reorganisation which came into effect in March 2015. Its seat is in Buzançais.

It consists of the following communes:

1. Argy
2. Arpheuilles
3. Buzançais
4. La Chapelle-Orthemale
5. Châtillon-sur-Indre
6. Chezelles
7. Cléré-du-Bois
8. Clion
9. Fléré-la-Rivière
10. Murs
11. Niherne
12. Palluau-sur-Indre
13. Saint-Cyran-du-Jambot
14. Saint-Genou
15. Saint-Lactencin
16. Saint-Maur (partly)
17. Saint-Médard
18. Sougé
19. Le Tranger
20. Villedieu-sur-Indre
