= Châtillon-sur-Indre =

- Commune
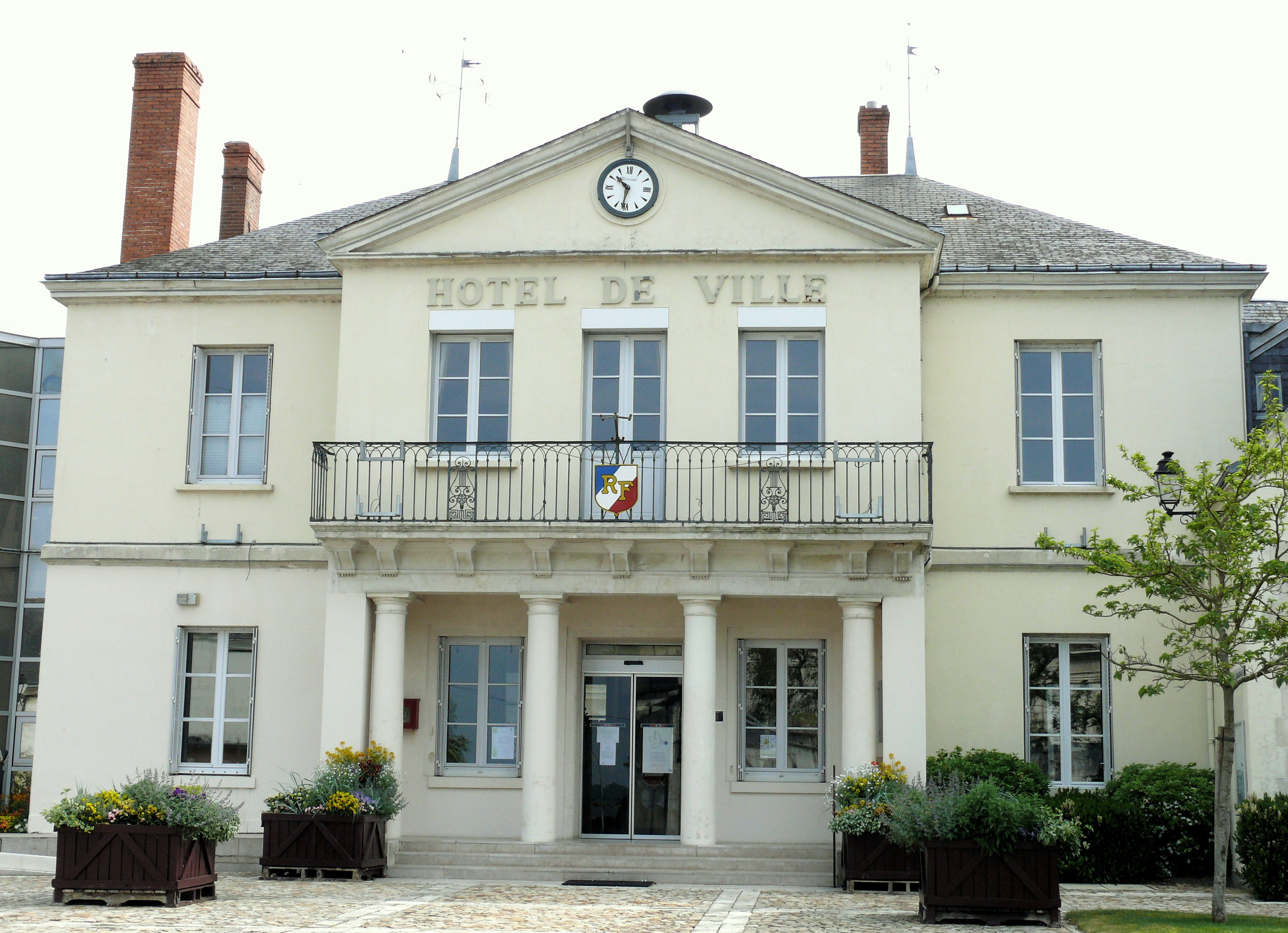
- Town hall

- Coat of arms
- Location of Châtillon-sur-Indre
- Location within France Location within Centre-Val de Loire
- Coordinates: 46°59′19″N 1°10′28″E
- Country: France
- Region: Centre-Val de Loire
- Department: Indre
- Arrondissement: Châteauroux
- Canton: Buzançais

Government
  - Mayor (2020–2026): Gérard Nicaud
- Area^{1}: 45.3 km^{2} (17.5 sq mi)
- Elevation: 88 m (289 ft)
- Highest elevation: 148 m (486 ft)
- Lowest elevation: 82 m (269 ft)
- Population (2023): 2,293
  - Density: 50.6/km^{2} (131/sq mi)
- Time zone: UTC+01:00 (CET)
  - Summer (DST): UTC+02:00 (CEST)
- INSEE/Postal code: 36045 /36700
- ^{1} French Land Register data, which excludes lakes, ponds, glaciers > 1 km^{2} (0.386 sq mi or 247 acres) and river estuaries.

Châtillon-sur-Indre (French pronunciation: [ʃatijɔ̃ syʁ‿ɛ̃dʁ], literally Châtillon on Indre) is a commune in the Indre department, central France.

== Population ==
Historical population

Year	Pop.	±% p.a.
1793	2,800	—
1800	2,627	−0.91%
1806	2,758	+0.81%
1821	2,952	+0.45%
1831	3,339	+1.24%
1836	3,312	−0.16%
1841	3,575	+1.54%
1846	3,676	+0.56%
1851	3,925	+1.32%
1856	3,926	+0.01%
1861	3,869	−0.29%
1866	3,875	+0.03%
1872	3,643	−1.02%
1876	3,455	−1.32%
1881	3,436	−0.11%
1886	3,500	+0.37%
1891	3,555	+0.31%
1896	3,628	+0.41%
1901	3,662	+0.19%

Year	Pop.	±% p.a.
1906	3,542	−0.66%
1911	3,621	+0.44%
1921	3,371	−0.71%
1926	3,416	+0.27%
1931	3,335	−0.48%
1936	3,376	+0.24%
1946	3,599	+0.64%
1954	3,404	−0.69%
1962	3,479	+0.27%
1968	3,658	+0.84%
1975	3,624	−0.13%
1982	3,526	−0.39%
1990	3,262	−0.97%
1999	3,119	−0.50%
2007	2,885	−0.97%
2012	2,730	−1.10%
2017	2,567	−1.22%
2023	2,293	−1.86%

Source: EHESS and INSEE (1968-2023)

== See also ==
- Communes of the Indre department
