= Brigueuil =

- Commune
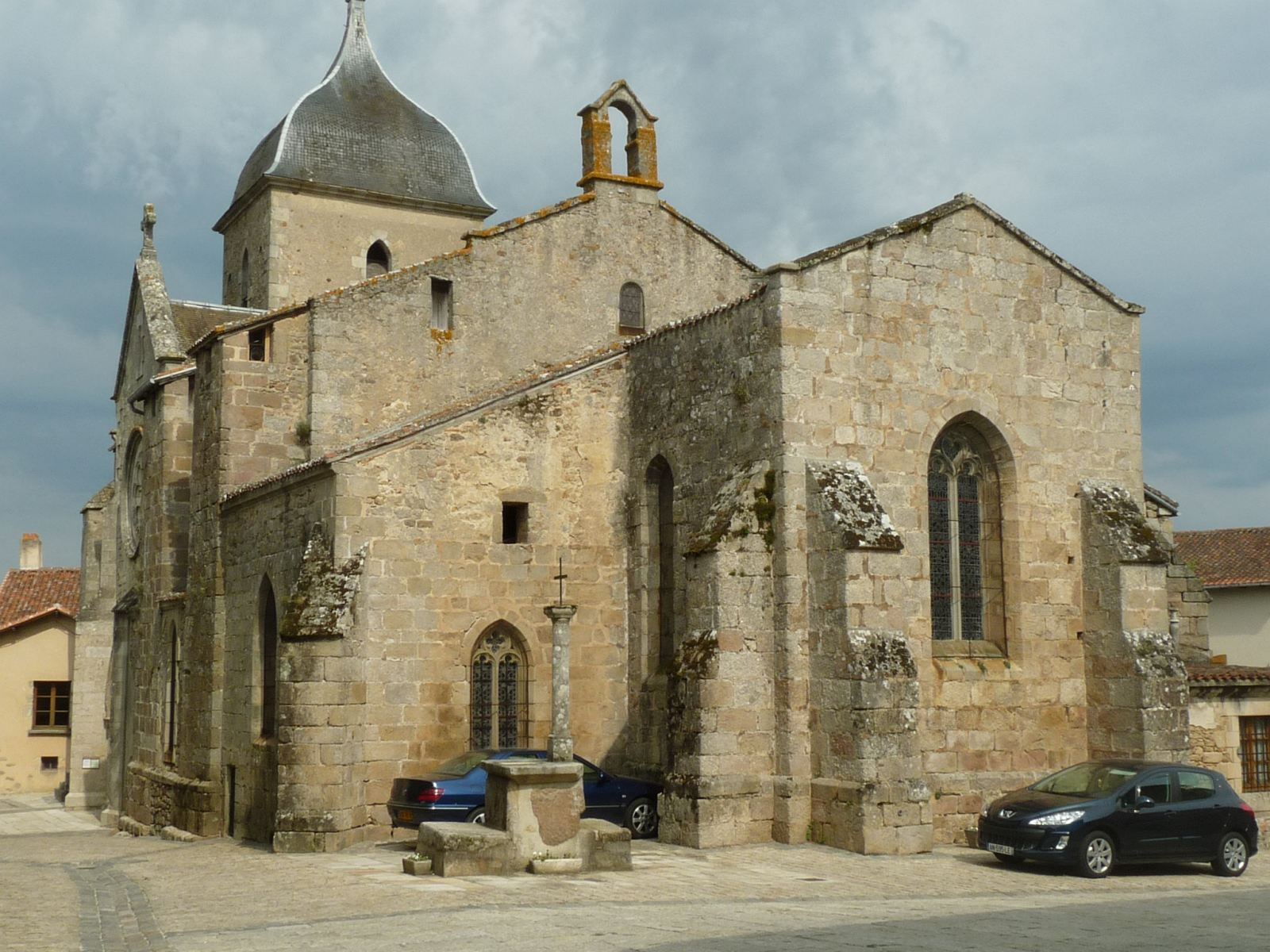
- The church in Brigueuil

- Coat of arms
- Location of Brigueuil
- Location within France Location within Nouvelle-Aquitaine
- Coordinates: 45°57′13″N 0°51′40″E
- Country: France
- Region: Nouvelle-Aquitaine
- Department: Charente
- Arrondissement: Confolens
- Canton: Charente-Vienne
- Intercommunality: Charente Limousine

Government
  - Mayor (2020–2026): Robert Rougier
- Area^{1}: 47.07 km^{2} (18.17 sq mi)
- Elevation: 254 m (833 ft)
- Highest elevation: 347 m (1,138 ft)
- Lowest elevation: 190 m (620 ft)
- Population (2023): 1,095
  - Density: 23.26/km^{2} (60.25/sq mi)
- Time zone: UTC+01:00 (CET)
  - Summer (DST): UTC+02:00 (CEST)
- INSEE/Postal code: 16064 /16420
- ^{1} French Land Register data, which excludes lakes, ponds, glaciers > 1 km^{2} (0.386 sq mi or 247 acres) and river estuaries.

Brigueuil (French pronunciation: [bʁiɡœj]; Limousin: Briguelh) is a commune in the Charente department in southwestern France.

== Population ==
Historical population
Year	Pop.	±% p.a.
1968	1,108	—
1975	978	−1.77%
1982	957	−0.31%
1990	995	+0.49%
1999	1,007	+0.13%
2007	1,037	+0.37%
2012	1,056	+0.36%
2017	1,096	+0.75%
2023	1,095	−0.02%
Source: INSEE

== See also ==
- Communes of the Charente department
