= Clion, Indre =

Clion
- Commune
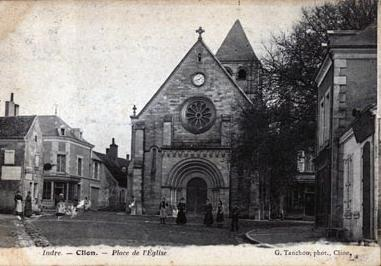
- The Church of Sainte-Colombe in Clion, in 1900
- Location of Clion
- Location within France Location within Centre-Val de Loire
- Coordinates: 46°56′32″N 1°14′00″E
- Country: France
- Region: Centre-Val de Loire
- Department: Indre
- Arrondissement: Châteauroux
- Canton: Buzançais

Government
  - Mayor (2020–2026): Béatrice Le Gloannec
- Area^{1}: 33.53 km^{2} (12.95 sq mi)
- Elevation: 108 m (354 ft)
- Highest elevation: 153 m (502 ft)
- Lowest elevation: 86 m (282 ft)
- Population (2023): 1,015
  - Density: 30.27/km^{2} (78.40/sq mi)
- Time zone: UTC+01:00 (CET)
  - Summer (DST): UTC+02:00 (CEST)
- INSEE/Postal code: 36055 /36700
- ^{1} French Land Register data, which excludes lakes, ponds, glaciers > 1 km^{2} (0.386 sq mi or 247 acres) and river estuaries.

Clion (French pronunciation: [klijɔ̃]), also referred as Clion-sur-Indre, is a commune in the Indre department, central France. It was known in the Roman period as Claudiomagus.

It is situated 38 km (24 mi) northwest of Châteauroux, the nearest large city. The Indre and Ozance rivers flow through the commune.

== Population ==
Historical population
Year	Pop.	±% p.a.
1968	1,561	—
1975	1,448	−1.07%
1982	1,387	−0.61%
1990	1,243	−1.36%
1999	1,156	−0.80%
2007	1,132	−0.26%
2012	1,093	−0.70%
2017	1,023	−1.32%
2023	1,015	−0.13%
Source: INSEE

Residents are known as Clionnais in French.

== See also ==
- Communes of the Indre department
