= Saint-Auban-sur-l'Ouvèze =

- Commune
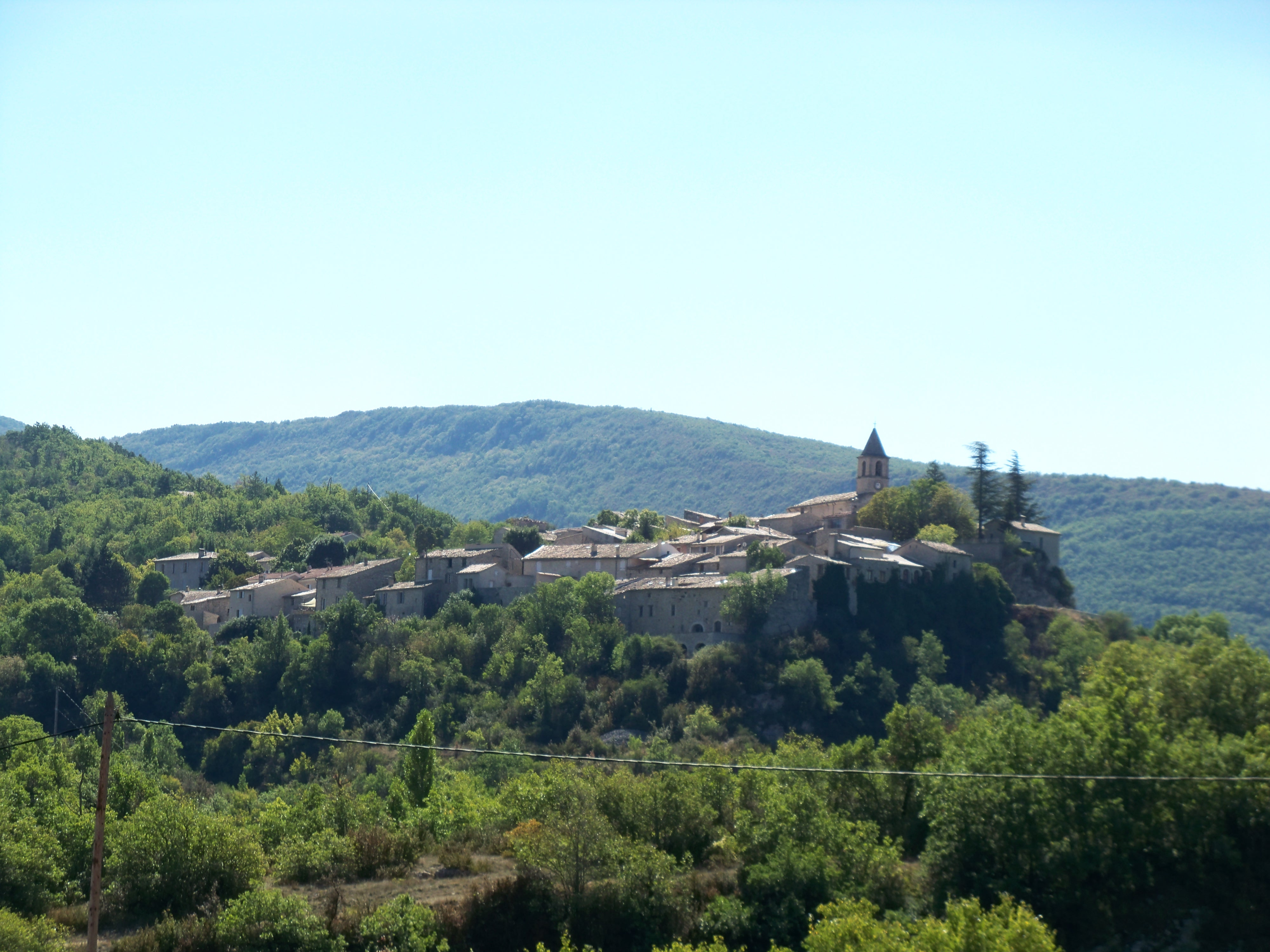
- A general view of Saint-Auban-sur-l'Ouvèze
- Location of Saint-Auban-sur-l'Ouvèze
- Location within France Location within Auvergne-Rhône-Alpes
- Coordinates: 44°17′00″N 5°25′00″E
- Country: France
- Region: Auvergne-Rhône-Alpes
- Department: Drôme
- Arrondissement: Nyons
- Canton: Nyons et Baronnies

Government
  - Mayor (2020–2026): Véronique Chauvet
- Area^{1}: 16.55 km^{2} (6.39 sq mi)
- Elevation: 637 m (2,090 ft)
- Highest elevation: 1,352 m (4,436 ft)
- Lowest elevation: 564 m (1,850 ft)
- Population (2023): 195
  - Density: 11.8/km^{2} (30.5/sq mi)
- Time zone: UTC+01:00 (CET)
  - Summer (DST): UTC+02:00 (CEST)
- INSEE/Postal code: 26292 /26170
- ^{1} French Land Register data, which excludes lakes, ponds, glaciers > 1 km^{2} (0.386 sq mi or 247 acres) and river estuaries.

Saint-Auban-sur-l'Ouvèze (French pronunciation: [sɛ̃.t‿obɑ̃ syʁ luvɛz], literally Saint Auban on the Ouvèze; Occitan: Sant Auban d'Ovèsa) is a commune in the Drôme department in southeastern France.

== Population ==
Historical population
Year	Pop.	±% p.a.
1968	215	—
1975	206	−0.61%
1982	213	+0.48%
1990	200	−0.78%
1999	188	−0.69%
2007	206	+1.15%
2012	220	+1.32%
2017	213	−0.64%
2023	195	−1.46%
Source: INSEE

== See also ==
- Communes of the Drôme department
