= Louis Dupin de Francueil =

Louis Claude Dupin de Francueil
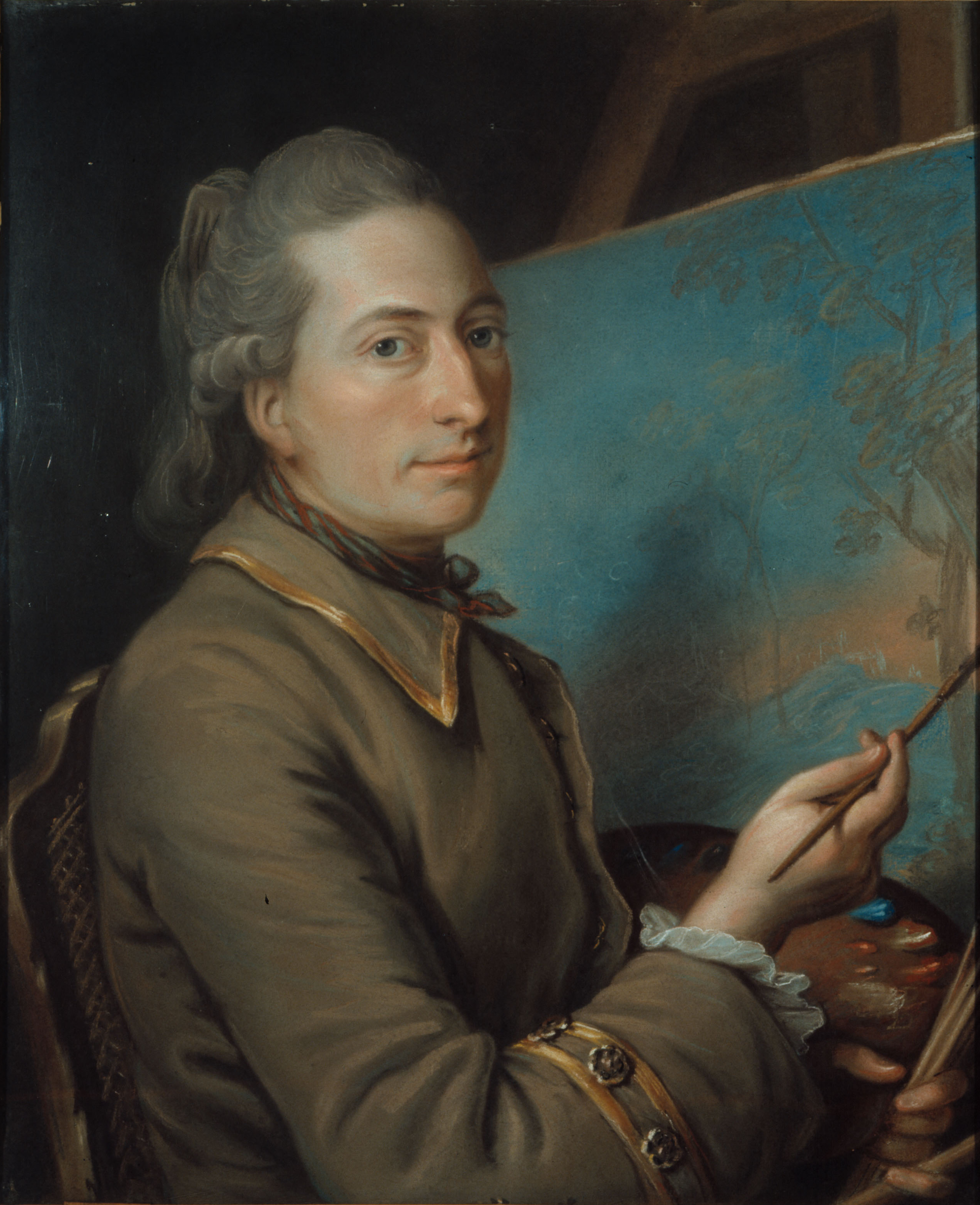
- Portrait of Louis Claude Dupin de Francueil, Musée de la vie romantique, Paris.
- Born: Louis Claude Dupin; November 6, 1715; Châteauroux, France
- Died: June 6, 1786 (aged 70); Paris, France
- Occupations: Financier, fermier général
- Known for: Grandfather of George Sand
- Spouses: Suzanne Bollioud (m. 1737; died 1754); Marie-Aurore de Saxe (m. 1777)
- Children: Madeleine-Suzanne Dupin de Francueil; Jean-Claude Leblanc de Beaulieu (illegitimate); Maurice Dupin de Francueil
- Parent(s): Claude Dupin (father); Marie Jeanne Bouilhat (mother)
- Relatives: Jacques-Armand Dupin de Chenonceaux (half-brother)

Louis Claude Dupin, lord of Francueil, known as Dupin de Francueil (6 November 1715 - 6 June 1786) was a French financier and fermier général.

== Life ==
He was born in Châteauroux and baptised the following day. to Claude Dupin (squire, lord of Chenonceaux, receiver general of finances for Metz and Alsace then secretary to the king and fermier général) and his wife Marie Jeanne Bouilhat. On 25 December 1728 Claude was made secretary to the king, allowing him and his descendants to acquired nobility in the first degree. Louis-Claude took the title 'de Francueil' - he extended the Chenonceau estate (owned by his family since 1733) to include that village. To differentiate the families his half brother Jacques-Armand became 'Dupin de Chenonceaux'.

In Paris on 15 May 1737 he married Suzanne Bollioud from Saint-Jullien. They only had one child, Madeleine-Suzanne Dupin de Francueil, born in Paris on 14 July 1751. Suzanne died in Paris on 3 September 1754 aged thirty-five.

Aged sixty-one he married again, this time in the chapel of the French embassy in London on 14 January 1777 due to fear of opposition from the French court or their families. His new wife was Marie-Aurore de Saxe, thirty-three years his junior, an illegitimate daughter of marshal de Saxe and widow of the count of Horn. On returning to France their marriage was confirmed in Paris on 15 April the same year. Their son Maurice Dupin de Francueil later became chef d'escadron in the 1st Hussar Regiment and was father of author George Sand.

For a time Louis Dupin de Francueil was the lover of Louise d'Épinay. They had two children, including Jean-Claude Leblanc de Beaulieu (future bishop of Rouen then of Soissons, Laon and Saint-Quentin). He introduced her to Jean-Jacques Rousseau, then secretary to his mother-in-law Madame Dupin. Hoping to gain entry into the Académie des sciences, he had Rousseau begin a book of popular science, but it was never completed.

Louis Dupin de Francueil died in his hôtel particulier at 15 rue du Roi-de-Sicile in the parish of Saint-Gervais in Paris.

== Bibliography (in French) ==
- Ranjard, Robert (8 June 1976) [1950]. Le secret de Chenonceau. Tours: Éditions Gibert-Clarey. p. 177 - 210.
- du Pin de Beyssat, Louis (September 1908). Généalogie de la maison Du Pin du Xeme au XX siecle (in French). Châteauroux: Imprimerie Badel.
- Collections et souvenirs de George Sand, Musée de la vie romantique, Hôtel Scheffer-Renan, Paris
- Dictionnaire des scientifiques de Touraine, Académie des sciences, arts et belles-lettres de Touraine, 2017
- Sand, George (15 April 1847) [1856]. Histoire de ma vie. Vol. 1. Paris: Éditions Michel Lévy frères.
