= Jean-Claude Leblanc de Beaulieu =

- Archbishop of Arles
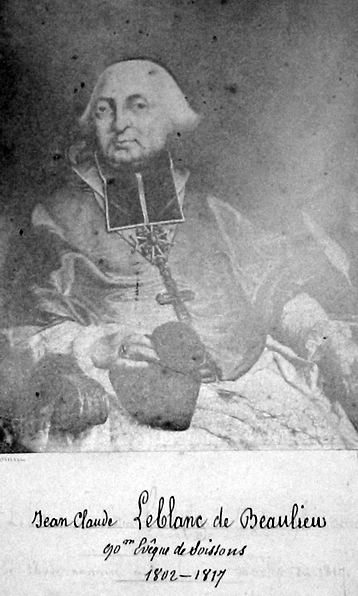
- Church: Catholic Church
- Archdiocese: Archdiocese of Arles
- In office: 1 October 1817 – 6 October 1822
- Predecessor: Jean Marie du Lau
- Successor: Diocese suppressed
- Previous posts: Administrator of Soissons (1819-1820); Bishop of Soissons (1802-1817)

Orders
- Consecration: 18 January 1800 by Jean-Baptiste Royer

Personal details
- Born: 29 May 1753 Paris, Kingdom of France
- Died: 13 July 1825 (aged 72) Paris, Kingdom of France

Baron Jean-Claude Leblanc de Beaulieu (29 May 1753 – 13 July 1825) was constitutional bishop of Seine-Inférieure from 1799 to 1801, with his seat in Rouen.

Born in Paris, he was an illegitimate son of Louis Dupin de Francueil (grandfather of George Sand) and Louise Florence Pétronille Tardieu d'Esclavelles, better known as Madame Lalive d’Épinay or Madame d'Épinay (1726-1783).

In 1802, after the signing of the Concordat between Pope Pius VII and Napoleon (then First Consul), he was made Bishop of Soissons from 9 April 1802 to 14 September 1820. A member of the minority at the Council of Paris in 1811, he exiled himself to London during the Hundred Days in 1815, returning to France after Napoleon's second fall.

== Life ==
=== Early life ===
M. Leblanc de Beaulieu was "the fruit of very passionate and very publicised love" between Dupin de Francueil and Madame d'Épinay. Raised on a farm and in the village of Beaulieu, he became very devout and entered holy orders as a young man. According to Sand, he looked very much like his mother.

After studying theology in Soissons de Beaulieu served in several ecclesiastical posts in the archdiocese of Paris. On the outbreak of the French Revolution he became a constitutional priest in 1791. In 1798 abbé Maugras, constitutional curé of Braine, collected the precious relics of Victricius and handed them over to his successor. Leblanc de Beaulieu, bishop of Soissons, attested to their authenticity in 1813. They were exhibited for veneration in Saint-Yved de Braine, a collegiate church that later became a parish church.

He was made constitutional bishop of Seine-Inférieure in December 1799. His seat for the latter was in Rouen, where he was consecrated a bishop in January 1800. He soon reopened Soissons Cathedral following building work that he had led - it had been a storehouse during the French Revolution and was heavily damaged.

=== de Beaulieu and the Concordat ===
Bonaparte tried to place some former constitutional bishops onto the staff discussing the 1801 Concordat between France and the papacy. Pius VII seemed to give in by promulgating the letter Post multos labores in July 1801, which imposed such stringent conditions on the former constitutional bishops that they rebelled, bringing Rome and Paris to the brink of rupture in two major crises in 1802 and 1804.

On 15 April 1802 (Maundy Thursday) Le Coz, Saurine and Périer presented themselves to the papal legate Giovanni Battista Caprara to ask for canonical institution as foreseen by the Concordat. Following his own logic, Caprara opposed this, setting adherence to the 'indirect' version of Post multos labores as a prerequisite. The group rejected that, as Caprara had expected.

A second group then arrived, consisting of Lacombe, Belmas, de Beaulieu and Jean-Baptiste Gobel (a former Jansenist curé in revolutionary Paris and fierce opponent of constitutional bishops). This former canon of the Sainte-Geneviève, who had played an important rôle as Gallican theological advisor to the Committee of United Bishops, was one of the last to resign as a constitutional bishop, namely of Seine-Inférieure (now Seine-Maritime). All recognised his pastoral zeal at Saint-Séverin and then in Soissons.

Within the framework of the Concordat between France and the Papacy de Beaulieu was appointed bishop of Soissons in April 1802 and confirmed by the cardinal legate, after declaring his allegiance to the Holy See whilst not renouncing his constitutional past.

De Beaulieu's case was the most contested. He was one of those who resisted the Holy Week celebrations. In the end, however, he publicly recanted in 1804 before the arrival of Pius VII. This meant that as of November 1804 there were eight bishops in France who had not retracted directly or indirectly.

=== de Beaulieu and Napoléon ===
As First Consul, Napoleon was keen to press on with his naval and military plans and so carried out an inspection tour of ports in northern France. Many towns in the area asked to host him and a deputation from Soissons met him in Reims, where he stated he would visit them on his return trip to Paris.

Thus, on 5 August 1803, de Beaulieu prepared the city for Napoleon's visit, stating:

What more favourable circumstance could there be to thank the father of mercies for what he has done for France than when Bonaparte, giving life to our lands by his presence, comes here to spread joy and gladness? Appear, First Consul, appear in our countryside, within our walls. May each of us see, at least for a moment, the one we hold in our hearts ...

On 25 April 1805 he convinced Napoleon to issue a decree allowing de Beaulieu to demolish the abbey church of Saint-Jean-des-Vignes in Soissons despite opposition from the city's population.

He continued to busy himself in rebuilding and reorganising his diocese (in 1813 he verified and recognised the authenticity of the relics of Grimonia), until during the Hundred Days he stated he only recognised Louis XVIII as the legitimate sovereign of France. Napoleon wrote to Bigot de Préameneu on 23 May 1815 instructing him to dismiss de Beaulieu and "send him back to his own country", but de Beaulieu instead took himself into exile in London until Napoleon's defeat and the king's return.

=== Later life ===
A new concordat was proposed in 1817 to reestablish the episcopal sees and on 11 June that year de Beaulieu was suggested for that of Arles, confirmed by the Holy See in October. Opposition in both chambers led to that concordat being scotched, though its proposal for the see of Arles was partially revived by a law of 4 July 1821 reestablishing that see.

In 1817, count Roch-Étienne de Vichy (former vicar general of Évreux, chaplain to Marie-Antoinette and Marie Thérèse, and last head of the priory at Anzy-le-Duc) was made bishop of Soissons, then bishop of Autun in 1819, holding the latter until his death in 1829. de Beaulieu retired for health reasons in September 1820 and died in the séminaire des Missions étrangères de Paris almost five years later.

== Sources (in French) ==
- Correspondence between Napoleon and count Bigot de Préameneu from 1800 to 1815.
- Annales historiques de la Révolution Française - Numéro 337- Bernard Plongeron - Face au Concordat (1801), résistances des évêques anciens constitutionnels.
- Les passages de l'empereur et des impératrices à Soissons - 1803–1815
- Almanach impérial pour l'année 1810 - Section première, culte catholique, archevêques et évêques de France.

== Bibliography (in French) ==
- François-Xavier de Feller (ed.), Claude-Ignace Busson (ed.) and Charles Weiss (ed.), Biographie universelle : ou dictionnaire des hommes qui se sont fait un nom par leur génie, leurs talents, leurs vertus, leurs erreurs ou leurs crimes, Paris, Éditions J. Leroux, Jouby et Cie, 1847 (1re éd. 1781), 642 p., « Beaulieu », p. 504.

== External links (in French) ==
- Annales historiques de la Révolution française - Bernard Plongeron - Face au Concordat (1801), résistances des évêques anciens constitutionnels.

Catholic Church titles
Preceded by Henri Joseph Claude de Bourdeille	Bishop of Soissons; 9 April 1802 to 14 September 1820	Succeeded by Guillaume Aubin de Villèle
