= Claude Dupin =

Claude Dupin (8 May 1686 – 25 February 1769) was a French financier and lord of Chenonceaux.

== Early life and education ==
Born in the parish of Saint-André in Châteauroux to Philippe (receiver of taxes for that town and an advisor to the king), he came from an old bourgeois family in Berry. He studied at the collège de Blois and became a captain or lieutenant in the Noailles Regiment, an infantry unit. However, he was "discharged for causing a disturbance in Issoudun".

== Career ==
In 1714 he took over his father's tax role.

He only rose through luck In 1722, Madame de Barbançois, eldest daughter of Madame de Fontaine, returning from the thermal baths at Bourbon-l'Archambault, found herself without lodgings whilst passing through Châteauroux. Dupin hosted her in his house immediately, cared for her, showed himself "unwilling to let her pay a single sou of all her expenses" and accompanied her to Paris. To thank him her mother offered to introduce him to the immensely wealthy financier Samuel Bernard, lover of Madame de Fontaine, who recognised his abilities and made him Receiver General of Finances for Metz and Alsace.

On 1 October 1726, after another intervention by Bernard and thanks to a loan from him, Dupin gained one of the forty extremely lucrative places of the fermier général despite being well under the usual for such a post. He was in that post for 36 years. He was sent around the kingdom for fourteen years and for nearly twelve years was on the Comité des caisses, the Ferme's governing body. He showed particular interest for the authorities for tobacco and major salt gabelles, which led Diderot and d'Alembert to ask Dupin to write the "salts" entry in their Encyclopédie.

On 24 December 1728, he became king's secretary at the Grand Collège, which brought him and his two sons into the nobility. One of the most lavish men of his time, he built a huge fortune and acquired prestigious estates.

== Personal life ==
He married on 7 January 1714 he married Marie-Jeanne Bouilhat de Laleuf (1696–1720), a notable figure from Châteauroux. They had a son, Louis-Claude, on 6 November 1715, born in Châteauroux – he was nicknamed "Dupin de Francueil" and was grandfather to George Sand.

Claude Dupin married a second time to Bernard's illegitimate daughter Louise de Fontaine on 1 December 1722 in Paris at Saint-Roch, Paris. With her, on 3 March 1727 in the Saint-Roch parish of Paris, he had a second son, {{ill|Jacques-Armand Dupin de Chenonceaux|Jacques-Armand, known as "Dupin de Chenonceaux".

== Works ==
- Économiques, 1745, 3 vol. in-4°
- Mémoires sur les blés, 1748
- Réflexions sur l'Esprit des lois, 1749, 2 vol. in-8°
- Observations sur l'Esprit des Lois, 1757–1758, 3 vol. in-8°

== Bibliography (in French) ==
- Ranjard, Robert (8 June 1976) [1950]. "Monsieur et madame Dupin". Le secret de Chenonceau. Tours: Éditions Gibert-Clarey. p. 177–210.
- Barthélemy François Joseph Mouffle D'Angerville, Vie privée de Louis XV : ou principaux événements, particularités et anecdotes de son règne, vol. 1, London, Éditions John Peter Lyton, 1 December 1780 (republished 1796, with the title Siècle de Louis XV) (1re éd. 1781), 398 p. , chap. XXXIII, p. 288–290.

== External links (in French) ==
- "Histoire et généalogie de la famille Dupin et de ses alliances" (PDF). Les Amis du musée de Châteauroux (in French).
- Julie Ladant, Le fermier général Claude Dupin (1686–1769), Thèse Écoles des Chartes, 2000 (résumé)
- Henri Jougla de Morenas, le Grand Armorial de France, tome III et tome VII
