= Histoire de ma vie (George Sand) =

Autobiography by George Sand

- Title page for Histoire de ma vie (1855)
- Author: George Sand
- Language: French
- Genre: Autobiography
- Publication date: 1855
- Publication place: France

Histoire de ma vie is an autobiography by George Sand covering her life up to shortly before the Revolution of 1848. The autobiography was published in Paris in 1854 and 1855 by Victor Lecou.

George Sand had planned as early as 1835, shortly after the end of her relationship with Alfred de Musset, to write her memoirs. She started in April 1847 and, with many interruptions for other work, finished her memoirs in 1855. In the autobiography the dates and the succession of events are not entirely veracious. The work consists largely of extensive rewriting of letters that she sent and received. Histoire de ma vie is a literary masterpiece with value as a social document and a family history.

Avec une rare lucidité, elle analyse le «devenir soi» d’un caractère, rappelle sa petite enfance à Nohant, les conflits familiaux qui la déchirent, les tensions qui habitent une famille brisée par la mort du père, la grande mélancolie qui s’ensuit, jusqu’à sa tentative de suicide à 17 ans. Si elle évoque admirablement le passé, Sand sait aussi dire le présent et l’avenir : elle expose ses vues sur le devenir de la société, le rôle de la religion, la condition des femmes. Histoire de ma vie reste un modèle de vivacité, de courage, de franchise et de détermination.

(With a rare lucidity, she analyzes the "developing self" of a character, recalls her early childhood in Nohant, the family conflicts that lacerate her, the tensions plaguing a family broken by the death of the father, the great melancholy that ensues, leading up to her suicide attempt at age 17. If she evokes the past admirably, she also knows how to tell the present and the future: she set forth her views on the future of society, the role of religion, and the condition of women. Histoire de ma vie remains a model of courage, frankness and determination.)

The 1856 edition published in Paris by Michel Lévy Frères consists of 5 separate books with a total of 13 chapters. Histoire de ma vie is organized into 5 parts:

1. Histoire d’une famille de Fontenoy à Marengo;
2. Mes premières années (1800–1811);
3. De l’enfance à la jeunesse (1810–1819);
4. Du mysticisme à l’indépendance (1819–1832);
5. Vie littéraire et intime.

Gallimard published in 1970 an edition which was edited by Georges Lubin and then translated into English by a team of translators led by Thelma Jurgrau. The translation was published by State University of New York Press in 1991 with the title Story of My Life: The Autobiography of George Sand.

It was an open secret that many of George Sand's novels were woven out of her own experience; that many of her persons were elaborate studies of men and women that she had known, or were at least ideal developments of the dispositions of living people. It was the strangeness of her private life, and the many stories about her, that first caused intense excitement about her early writings. All through her career she kept up a personal relation with her readers, telling them in prefaces to her novels, or in Les Lettres d’un voyageur, something about her own state of mind, and her own judgment of her performances. Of course it was never the real George Sand that appeared in these confidences, but the ideal George Sand of the moment. The same half-imaginary being is the heroine of L’Histoire de ma vie, a book very useful to the student of the psychology of Madame Dudevandt. The incomplete autobiography has been called a romance; but at least it states events as the writer preferred to think that they happened, and displays herself as she saw herself in the mirror of her own fantasy. .... She was borne by her own courage and intellectual energy into the tempest of opinions, and was tossed hither and thither among unscrupulous men, for whom she was more than a match.
