= Marie-Aurore de Saxe =

French countess (1748–1821)

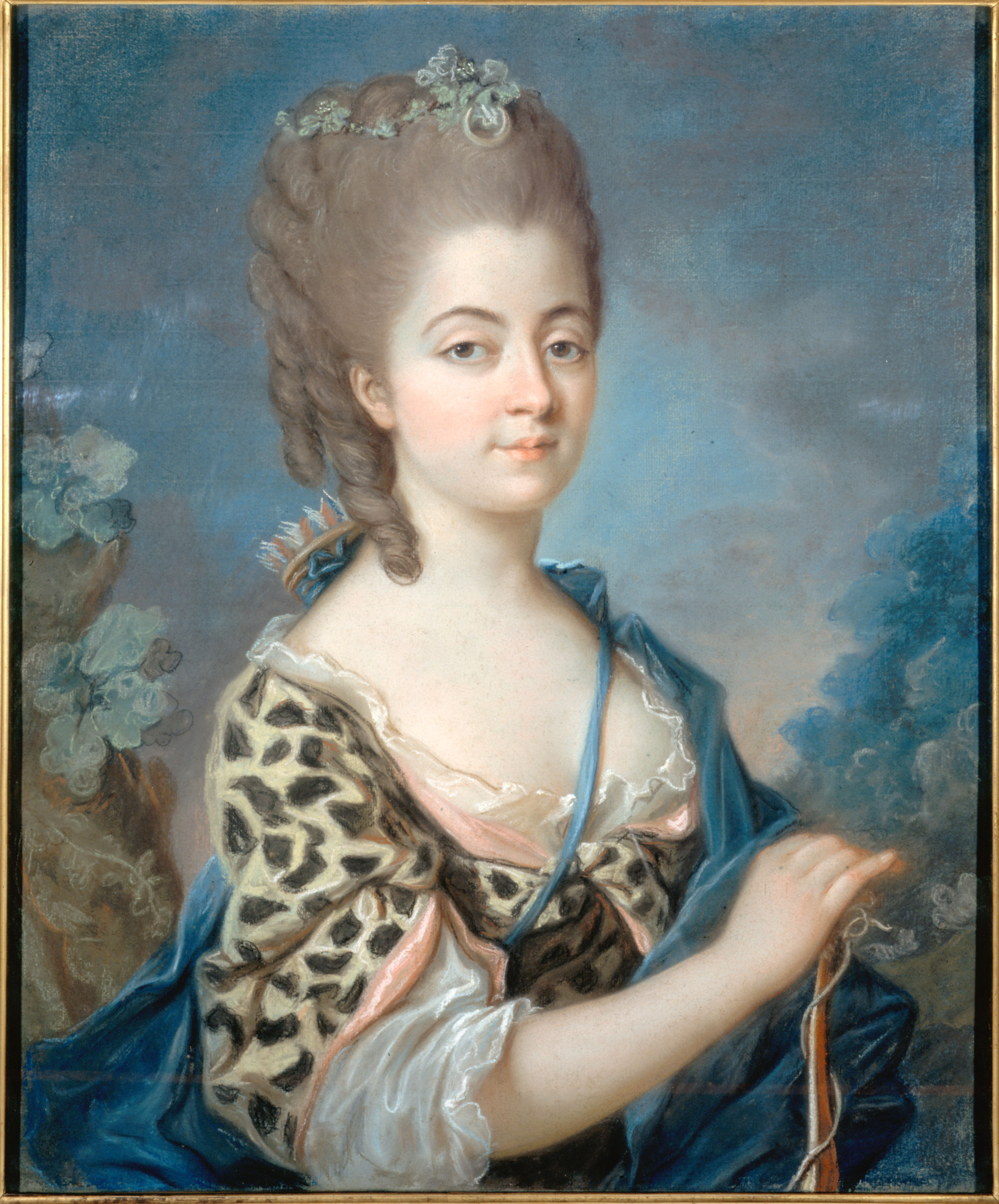
Marie-Aurore de Saxe as Diana. Portrait attributed to Adélaïde Labille-Guiard, ca. 1777. Currently displayed in the Musée de la Vie Romantique, Paris.

Marie-Aurore de Saxe (20 September 1748 – 26 December 1821), known after her first marriage as Countess of Horn and after the second as Madame Dupin de Francueil, was an illegitimate daughter of Marshal Maurice de Saxe and a grandmother of George Sand.

A notable free-thinker, she was interested in philosophers like Voltaire, Jean-Jacques Rousseau and Buffon. Her life was marked by the vicissitudes of history and personal dramas.

== Life ==
=== Origins and youth ===
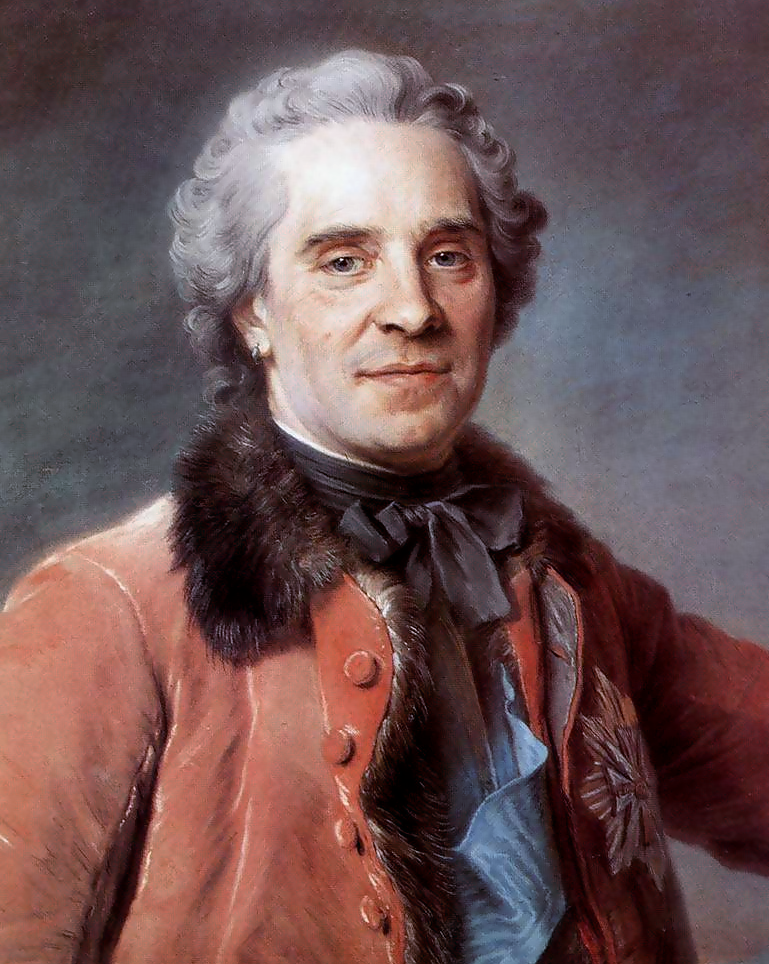
Maurice de Saxe, Marie-Aurore's father.

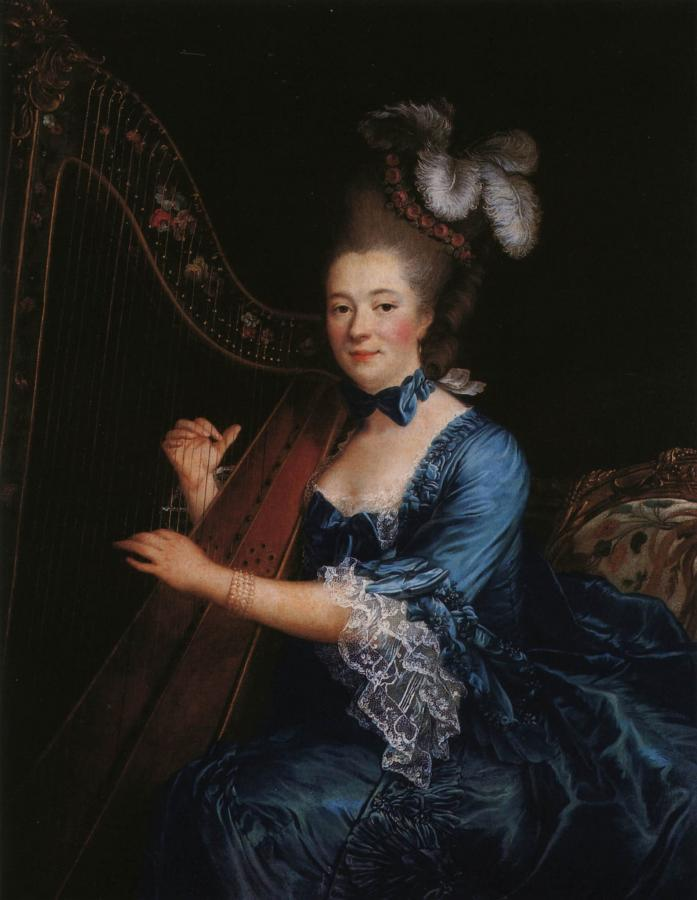
Marie Rinteau de Verrières, Marie-Aurore's mother.

Marie-Aurore was born on 20 September 1748. She was the illegitimate daughter of Maurice de Saxe, (Note: Maurice de Saxe, comte de la Raute (1696-1710) later comte de Saxe (1710-1750), was born on 28 October 1696 in Goslar and died on 30 November 1750 at the Château de Chambord.) Marshal of France, and Marie-Geneviève Rinteau, an actress. (Marshal Maurice de Saxe was himself the product of a love affair between Augustus II the Strong, King of Poland and Elector of Saxony, and Maria Aurora von Königsmarck.)

Marie-Aurore was baptized a month after her birth, on 19 October in the Church of St-Gervais-et-St-Protais. The child was registered as a daughter of Jean-Baptiste La Rivière, in fact a non-existent person, and was named after her paternal grandmother, the Countess von Königsmarck. Her godfather was the adjutant of the Marshal of Saxe, Antoine-Alexandre Colbert, marquis de Sourdis, and the godmother was her maternal aunt Geneviève-Claude Rinteau. The Marshal de Saxe showed little interest in the fate of his illegitimate daughter and bequeathed her nothing.

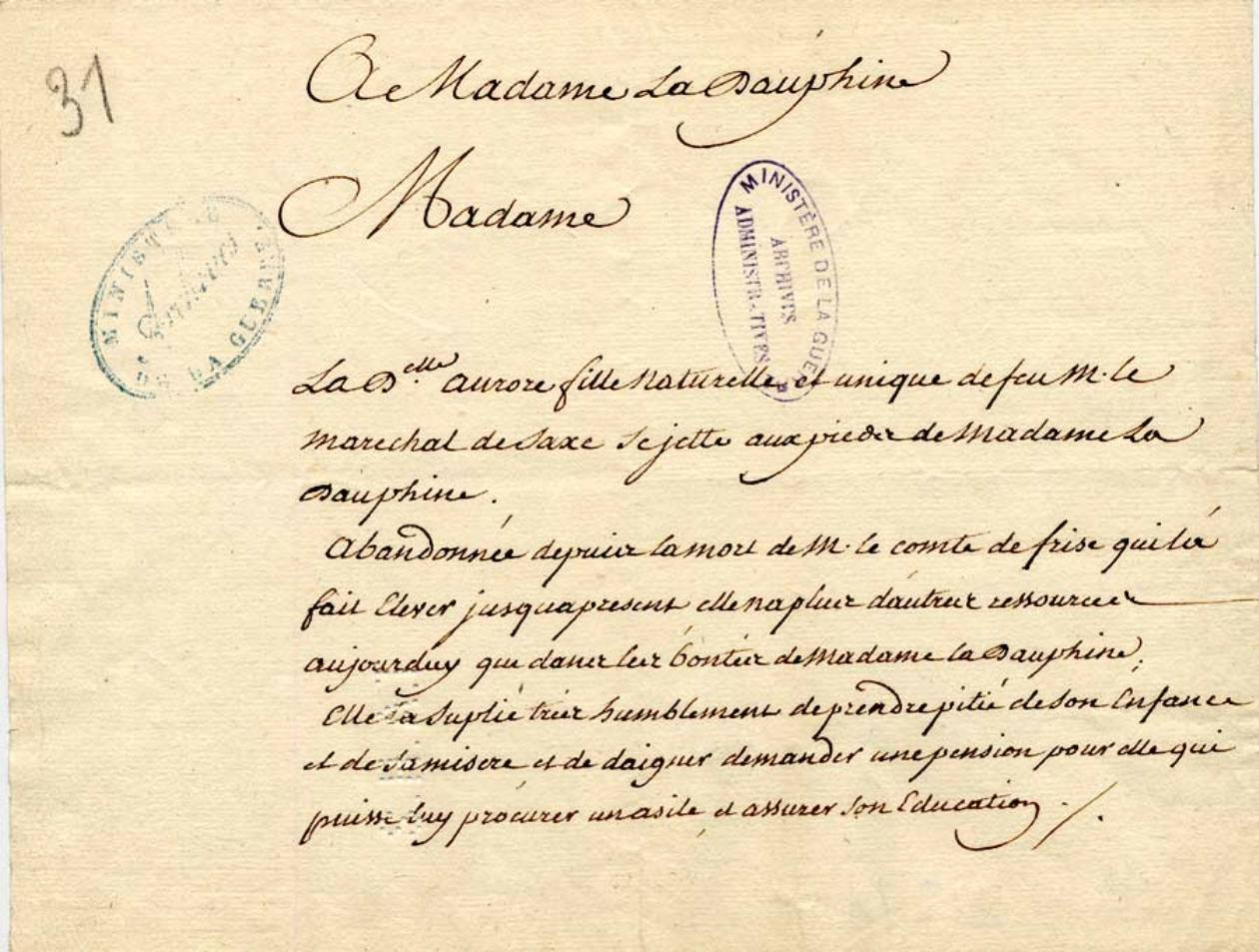
Petition sent in the name of Marie-Aurore to the Dauphine, born Maria Josepha of Saxony, 1755.

Marie-Aurore's mother later had love affairs with Jean-François Marmontel and the fermier général, Denis Joseph Lalive d'Épinay. The latter spent generously on her, and installed her, along with her sister, in the Quartier d'Auteuil.

One of the nephews of the Marshal de Saxe, the Count of Friesen, known in France under the name of Comte de Frise, who inherited property from the Marshal, provided financial help to Marie-Aurore, but his death in 1755 deprived her of all support. A petition was addressed to the Dauphine, Maria Josepha of Saxony, a niece of the Marshal, the same year in favor of Marie-Aurore, proving her existence and ensuring her education. King Louis XV granted her a pension of 800 livres.

Following the death of the Count of Friesen, Marie-Aurore (aged 7) was separated from her mother by command of the Dauphine. The Dauphine placed Marie-Aurore in an institution for young girls, firstly at the Ursuline convent in Saint-Cloud and later in the Maison royale de Saint-Louis in Saint-Cyr, founded by Madame de Maintenon.

=== Recognition and marriages ===
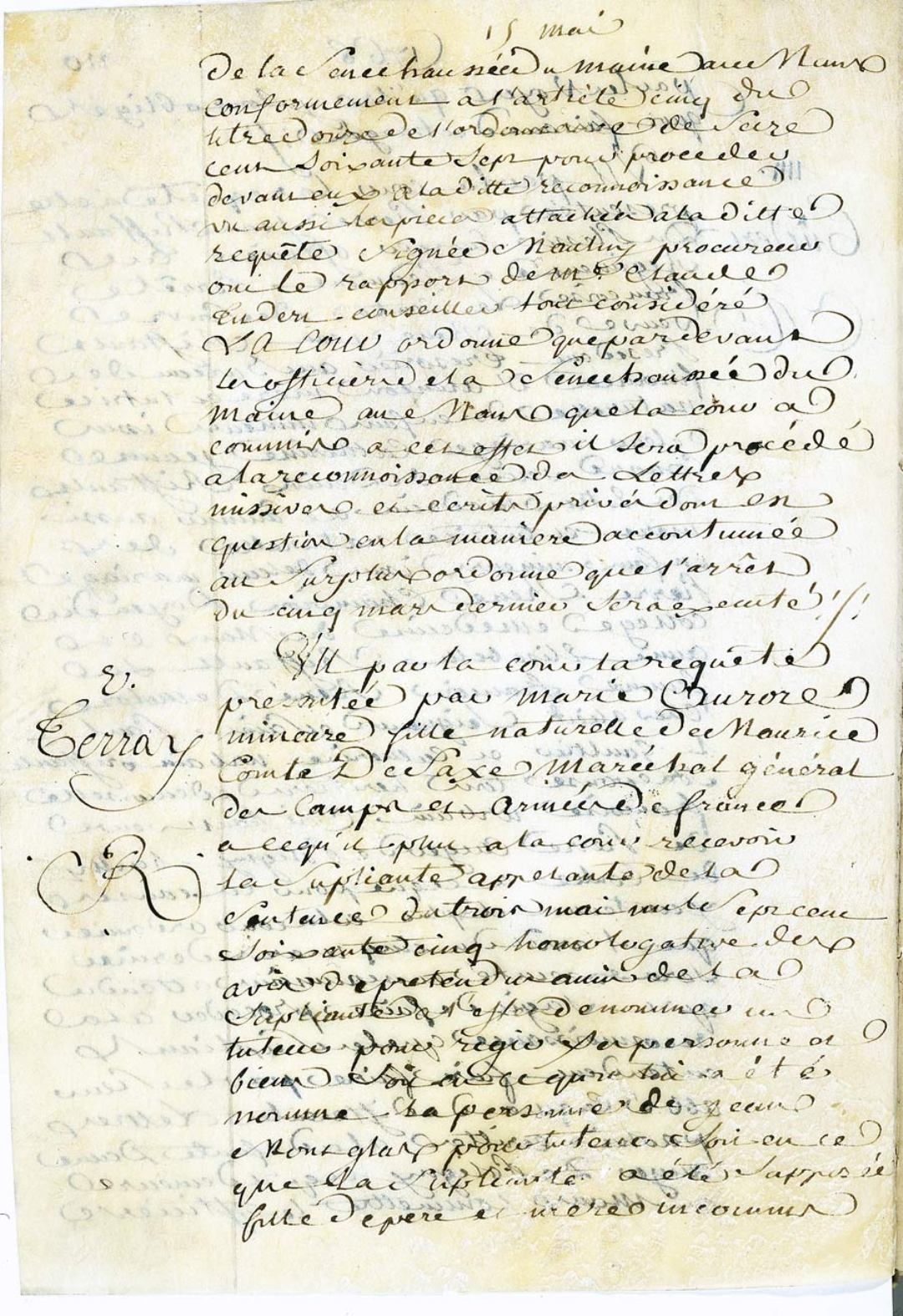
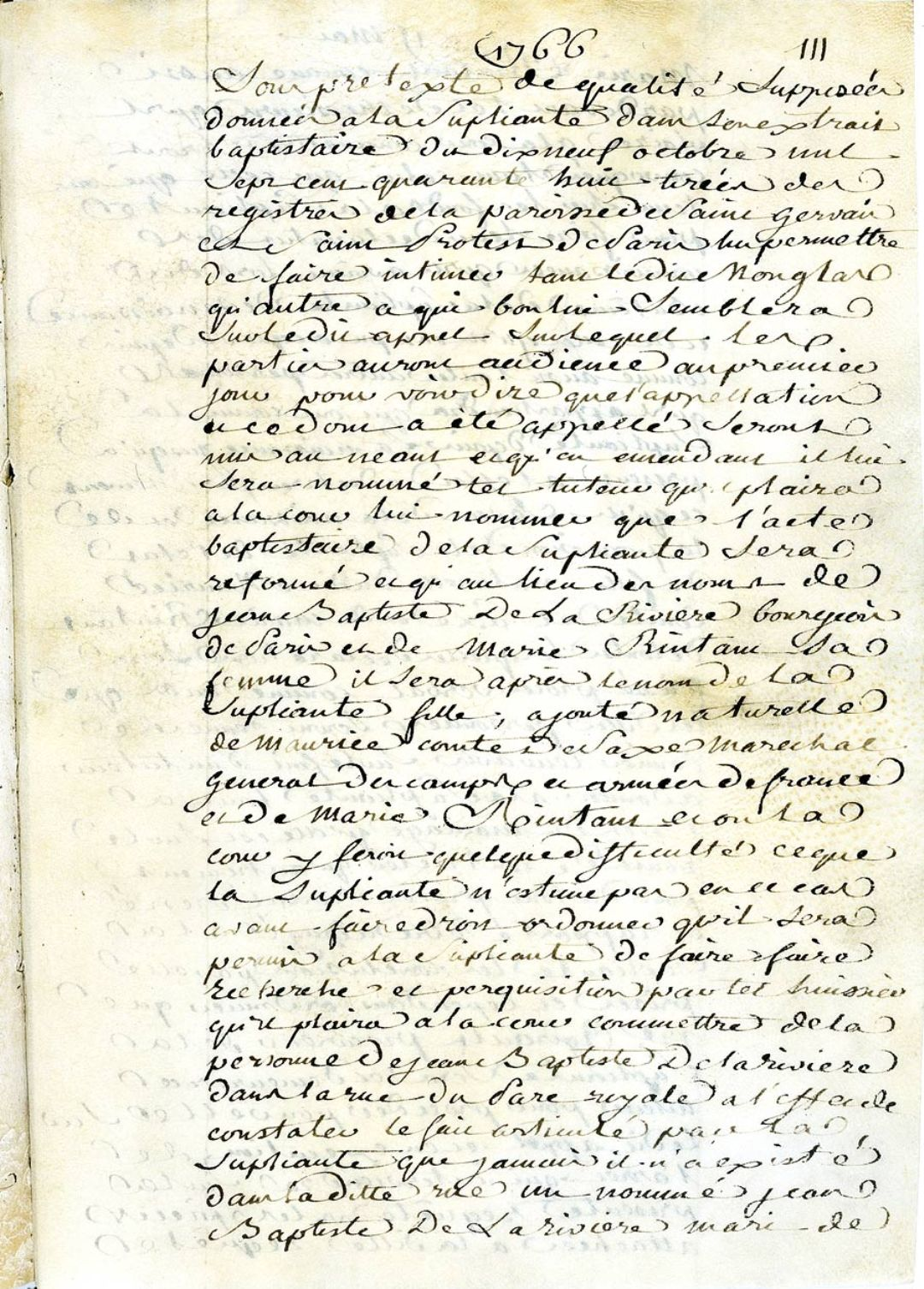
Official recognition of Marie-Aurore as daughter of the Marshal de Saxe by the Parlement of Paris, 15 May 1766. Source: Archives nationales (France).

The Dauphine also decided Marie-Aurore's future by organising her marriage to Comte Antoine de Horn. (Note: Antoine de Horn, born on 8 September 1722 at Mussy-la-Ville, was allegedly an illegitimate son of Louis XV.) In order to perform this marriage and be considered valid, her baptismal certificate had to be amended so the name of her real father appeared. Marie-Aurore appealed to the Parlement of Paris and on 15 May 1766, after a serious investigation, the sentence established that Marie-Aurore was the natural daughter of Maurice, comte de Saxe, Marshal of the camps and armies of France and Marie Rinteau.

Her marriage with the Comte de Horn took place on 9 June 1766 at Paris. Eight months later (20 February 1767), her husband was killed in a duel at Sélestat, aged 44. According to her granddaughter George Sand, this union was never consummated.

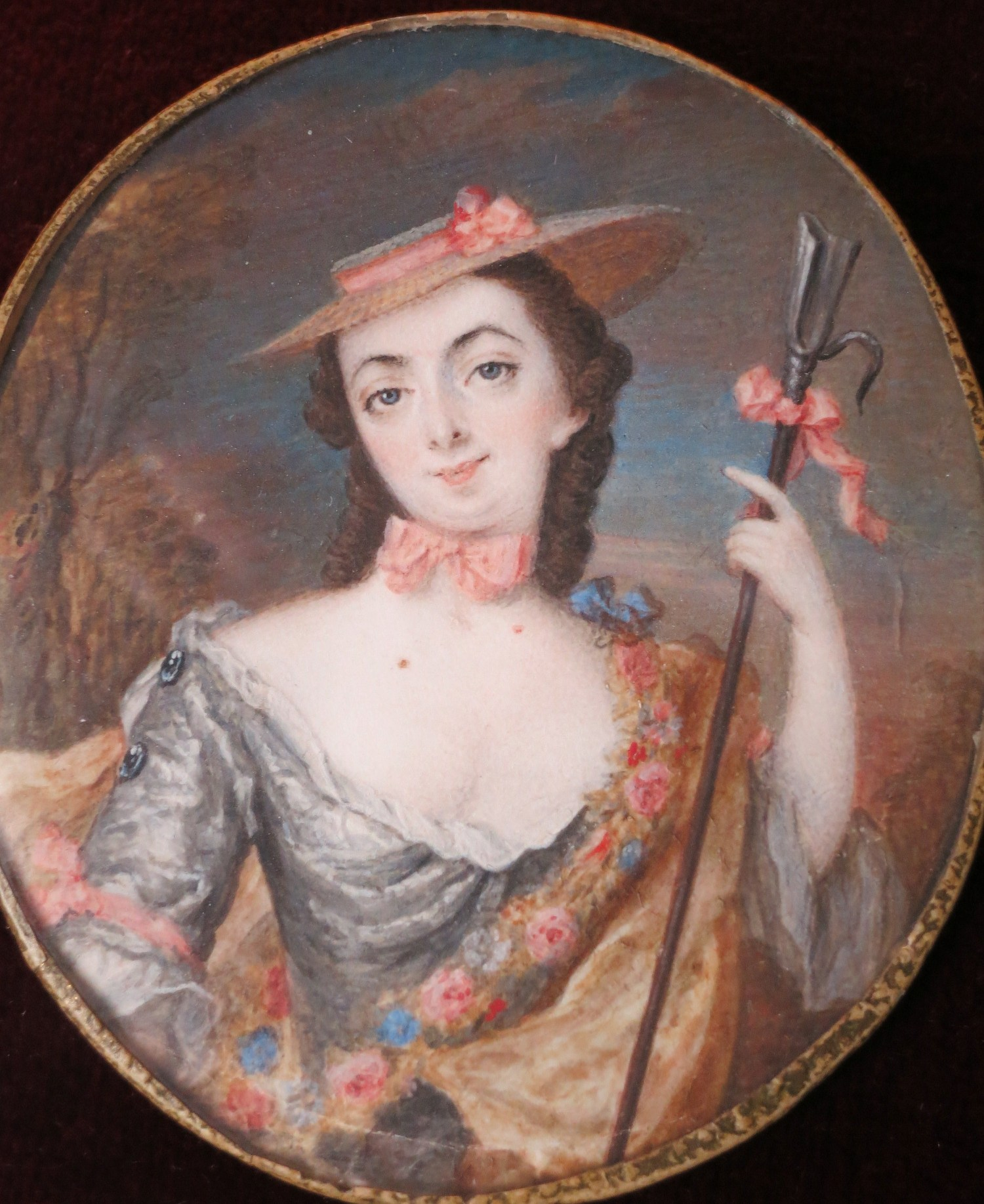
Marie-Aurore de Saxe dressed as a shepherdess, ca. 1770.

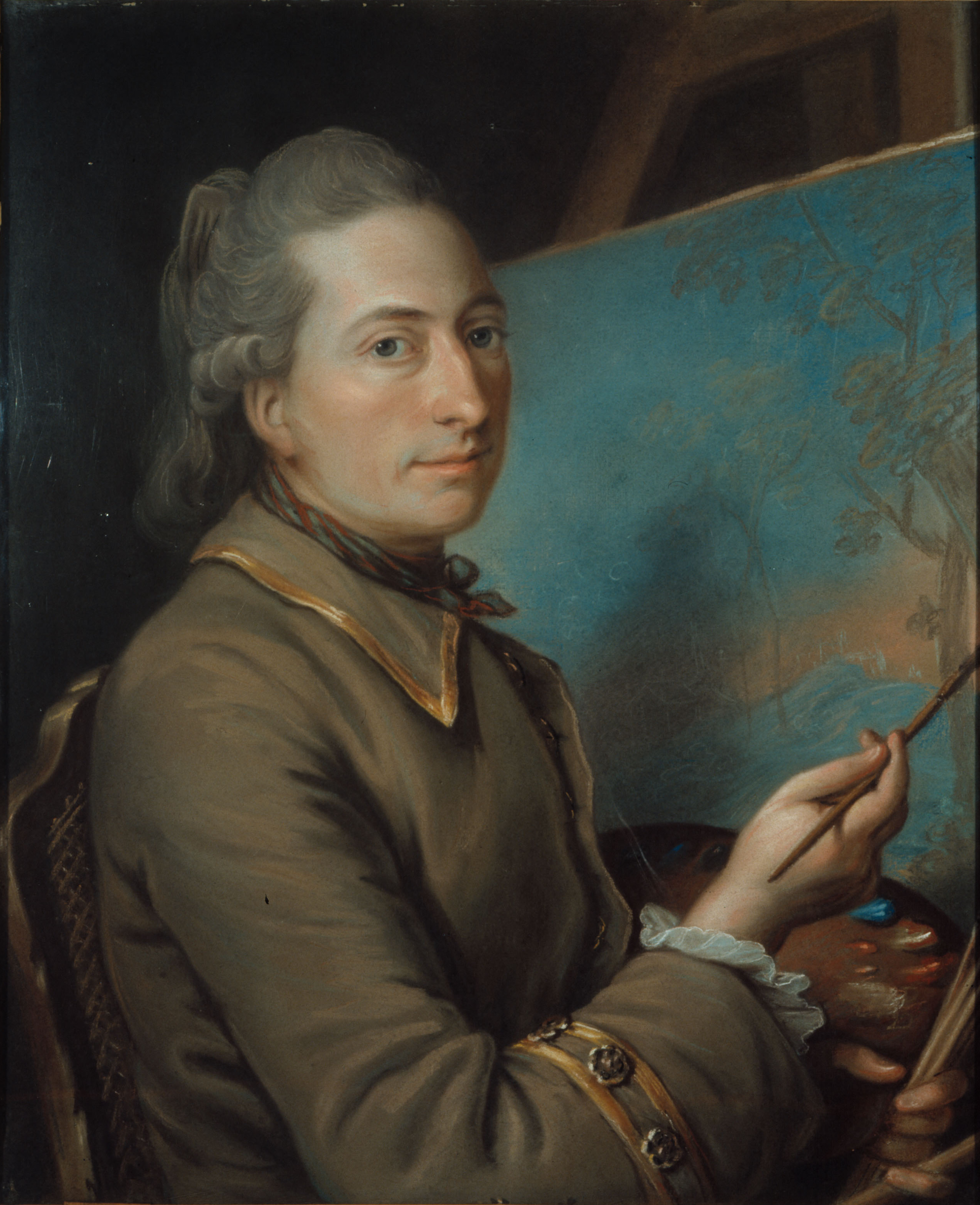
Louis-Claude Dupin de Francueil, Marie-Aurore's second husband.

Maria Josepha of Saxony died on 13 March 1767 at Versailles. Deprived of her protector, the pension that Marie-Aurore received didn't cover her expenses. She turned initially to Voltaire, an admirer of her father, who recommended that she approach the Countess of Choiseul, but this was unsuccessful. Then, Marie-Aurore returned to live with her mother, Marie Rinteau. On 22 October 1775 at Paris, Marie Rinteau died aged 45. Marie-Aurore then retired with a servant to the English convent at Fossés Saint-Victor street in Paris.

She was frequently visited there by Louis-Claude Dupin de Francueil, a 62-year-old (Note: Louis Dupin de Francueil was born in Châteauroux on 6 November 1715 and died in Paris on 6 June 1786.) financier and friend of Jean-Jacques Rousseau. Louis-Claude wasn't a stranger to Marie-Aurore; in fact, he was an old lover of her aunt Geneviève. Louis-Claude asked for the hand of Marie-Aurore. The wedding was celebrated in London on 14 January 1777 at the chapel of the French Embassy in England. Three months later, the newlyweds returned to France and validated their marriage at Paris on 15 April 1777 in the Church of St-Gervais-et-St-Protais. Years later, Marie-Aurore remembered her husband to their granddaughter:

An old love more than a young man, she said, and it's impossible not to love who loves us perfectly. I called him my husband my old father. Thus he wanted and never called me her daughter, even in public. And then she added, is that we were never in the old days!...This is the revolution that brought the old age into the world. Your grandfather, my child, was beautiful, elegant, neat, graceful, fragrant, cheerful, kind, affectionate and even-tempered until the hour of his death.

=== Madame Dupin de Francueil ===
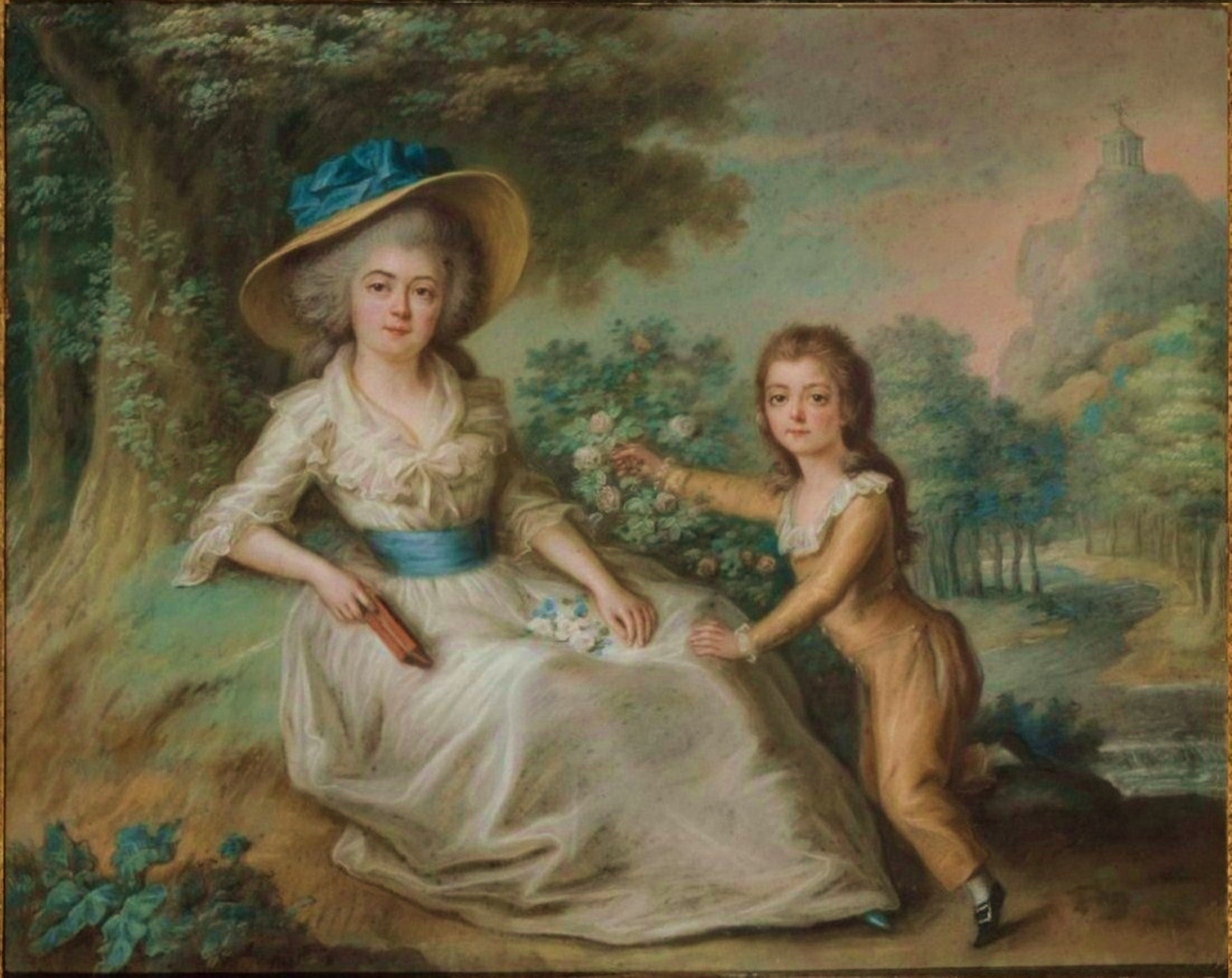
Marie-Aurore and her son Maurice.

On 9 January 1778, Marie-Aurore gave birth to a son, Maurice-François-Élisabeth Dupin de Francueil, in Le Marais district of Paris; his baptism took place on 18 January, being his godfather the Marquis François de Polignac and his godmother Élisabeth Varanchan, by marriage Madame de Chalut. The only child of Marie-Aurore and Louis-Claude Dupin de Francueil, he was named after his maternal grandfather, the Marshal de Saxe, and both godparents.

The couple spent part of the year at Châteauroux in 1783, where Louis-Claude managed the inheritance from his father Claude Dupin. They settled at Château Raoul, the former home of the Princes of Chauvigny, and led a lavish lifestyle well above their means. They had a large service with a stable, a cavalry and kennels with several dogs. They also had receptions and concerts. Louis-Claude Dupin invested in cloth factories that enriched the Berry citizens without being profitable for the owner. They also had a Hôtel located at the nº 15 of the Rue du Roi-de-Sicile at the parish of Saint-Gervais. Louis-Claude Dupin de Francueil died in his house in Paris on 6 June 1786.

After her husband's death, Marie-Aurore and her son left Châteauroux and moved to their house at the Rue du Roi-de-Sicile in Paris. During this time, she hired a young tutor to complete the education of her son, Jean-Louis-François Deschartres. (Note: Jean-Louis-François Deschartres was born in Laon in 1761 and died in 1828 in an asylum for old people, the Maison royale de santé in Paris. He also held the position of mayor in Nohant.)

During the revolutionary period, Marie-Aurore decided to acquire a property far away from Paris. She bought a mansion in Nohant-Vic near La Châtre with the remains of her fortune. On 23 August 1793 she bought the property for 230,000 livres from Pierre Philippe Péarron de Serennes, an old infantry officer and Governor of Vierzon, cousin of the family Dupin de Francueil. The property was not limited to the château de Nohant, and also included residences like la Chicoterie and several farms. In all her new domain covered more than 240 hectares.

=== The revolution and the empire ===
While still in Paris Marie-Aurore moved to the nº 12 of the Rue Saint-Nicolas, property of Monsieur Amonin. In the middle of the Reign of Terror, she hid her values and papers of nobility in the apartment of a gentleman, Monsieur de Villiers. Under a decree, it was forbidden to conceal wealth, especially gold, silver and jewelry. Following a denunciation, a search took place at night, on 25 November 1793. The goods were found and Marie-Aurore de Saxe was arrested the same day and imprisoned at the English convent. This religious establishment, where she had lived after the death of her first husband, was being used as a prison. If Marie-Aurore indeed had concealed valuables, she also hid papers that implicated her in the escape of several nobles, like the Comte d'Artois (future King Charles X). These papers weren't found but the risk of a second search was great. Her son and Deschartres forced their way into the apartment under seal to destroy the documents. The revolutionary government didn't survive the fall of Maximilien Robespierre and Marie-Aurore was released on 21 August 1794. In September 1794, Marie-Aurore returned to her estate of Nohant.

Maurice Dupin became a soldier during the general conscription of 5 September 1798. He began his military career with the coming of power of General Bonaparte. He participated in the Napoleonic Wars and became a lieutenant and head of the 1st Regiment of Hussars. Unbeknownst to his mother, he secretly married a commoner, Sophie-Victoire-Antoinette Delaborde, in Paris on 5 June 1804. This hasty marriage was due to Sophie's advanced state of pregnancy; one month later (1 July), she gave birth to a girl in Paris named Amantine-Lucile-Aurore Dupin, the future George Sand. (Note: Maurice Dupin had two children before his marriage, both born in La Châtre: a son, Hippolyte Chatiron (5 May 1799 – 23 December 1848) and a daughter, Jeanne Félicitée Molliet (31 May 1800 – 26 September 1883), neither of whom he recognized.)

=== Family tragedies ===
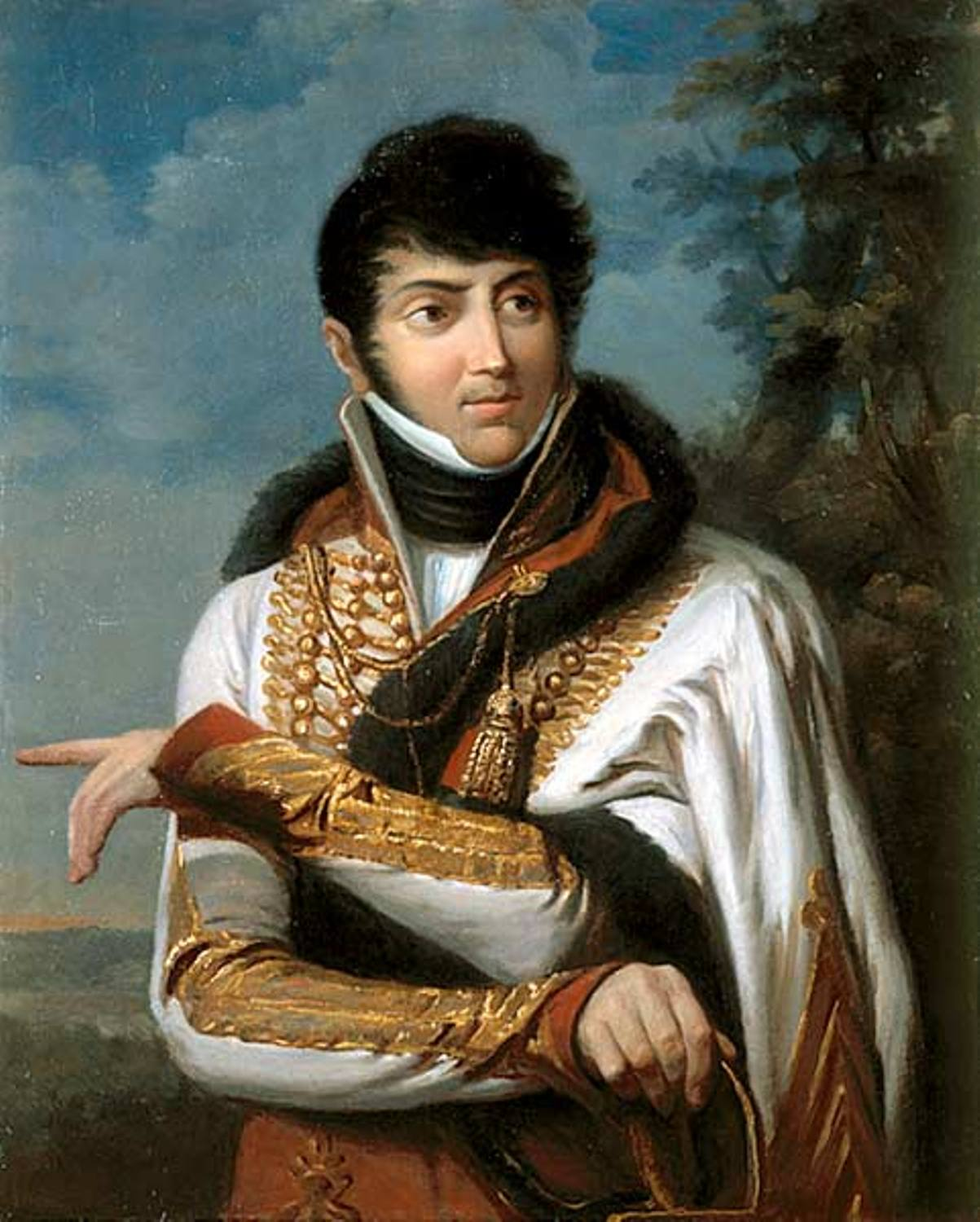
Maurice Dupin de Francueil, Marie-Aurore's son.

In March 1808 Maurice Dupin, an adjutant of Joachim Murat, was in Spain. Sophie was seven months pregnant, but decided to join her husband in Madrid with her daughter Aurore, despite the opposition of Maurice. Mother and daughter arrived in May, after a difficult journey. On 2 May, the people of Madrid rebelled and French troops suppressed the revolt. The second child of Maurice, a son named Auguste, was born in Madrid on 12 June 1808, but he was blind. After the departure of Murat for the throne of Naples, Maurice and his family returned to Nohant in July. On 8 September 1808, Auguste died of exhaustion. Eight days after the death of his son (16 September), Maurice died in a riding accident on the road from Châteauroux to Nohant.

Marie-Aurore wrote to her friend, François Robin de Scévole about the death of Maurice. The letter was wrongfully dated 12 September 1808, when Maurice died on 16 September. Marie-Aurore's tears leave traces on the paper. Her seal in the header of the letter, is black:

Monsieur de Scévole, Indre to Argenton:

I want to write to you myself, my friend, and I can't! You hear my cries, you see my tears, my despair. What can I tell you? I am still alive. Alas, to suffer, to weep, to go dwell on the grave of my child. It's there, close to me: he is deaf to my pain. This silence is stopping me to died! What shall I do now in life? More tomorrow! A frightful void, the bottom of which I find only the shadow of my dear Maurice! You know how much I loved him, despite his excess and troubles! Farewell, you see, my tears are blinding me, I succumb to my misfortune! However, I am still sensitive to the part of you and Madame de Scévole, well want to take and I'm sure you regret my dear son. Oh my God! What a pity!

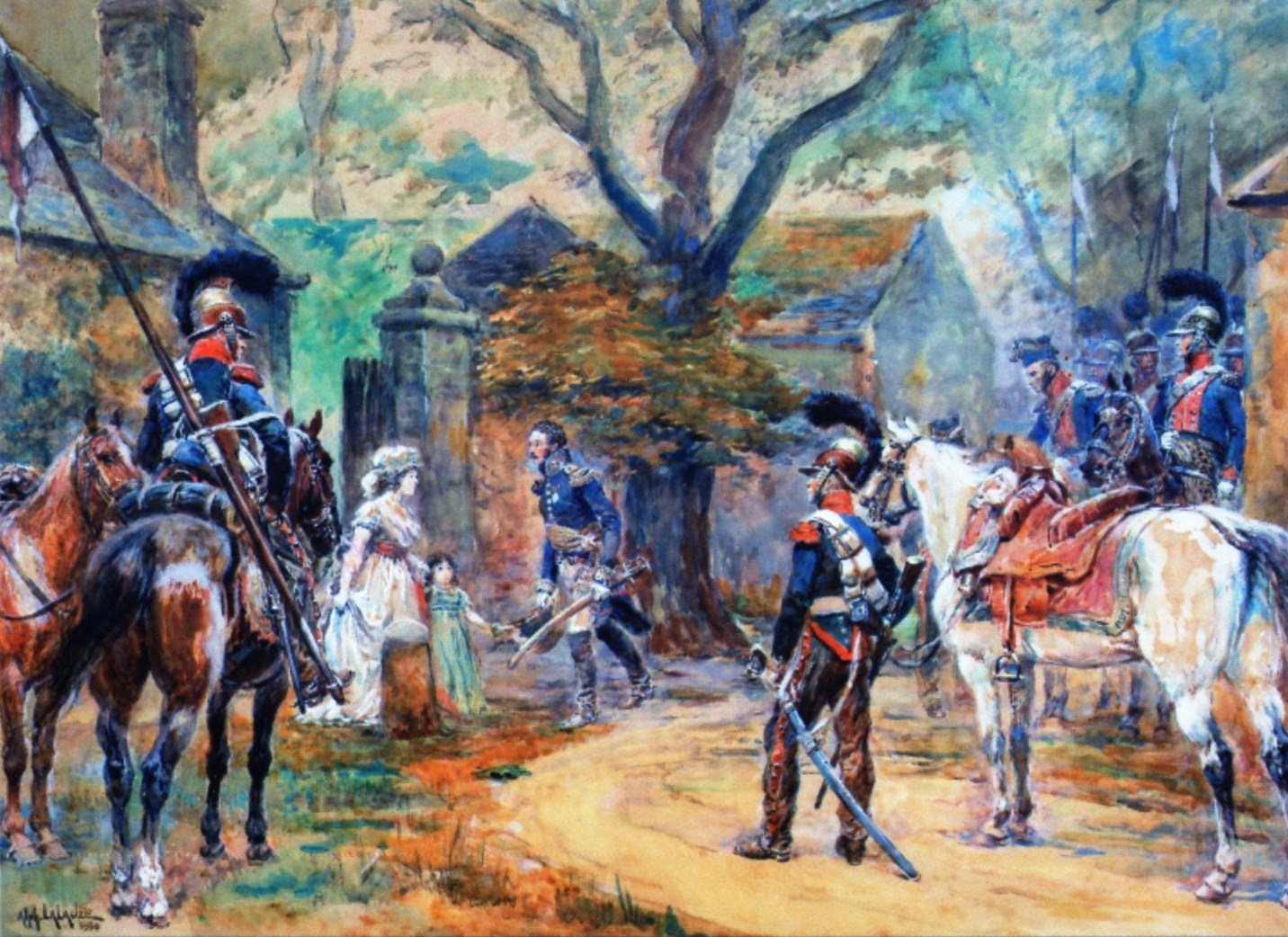
Marie-Aurore and her granddaughter received General Louis Pierre Alphonse de Colbert at Nohant in 1815. Gouache over paper by Alphonse Lalauze, 1930.

A bitter custody battle between Marie-Aurore and her daughter-in-law. Sophie-Victoire Delaborde relinquished the legal guardianship of her daughter on 28 January 1809 in favor of Marie-Aurore, after a monetary transaction and an annual pension. Aurore Dupin was raised by her grandmother and François Deschartres, the former tutor of Maurice. Marie-Aurore spent the winter months in Paris and bought an apartment in the Rue des Mathurins, near the house of her daughter-in-law. Despite her rights to visit, Sophie Delaborde didn't have permission to take her daughter Aurore to her own house. Marie-Aurore lavished great attention on her granddaughter and introduced her to Jean-Jacques Rousseau. Aurore was devoted to her grandmother.

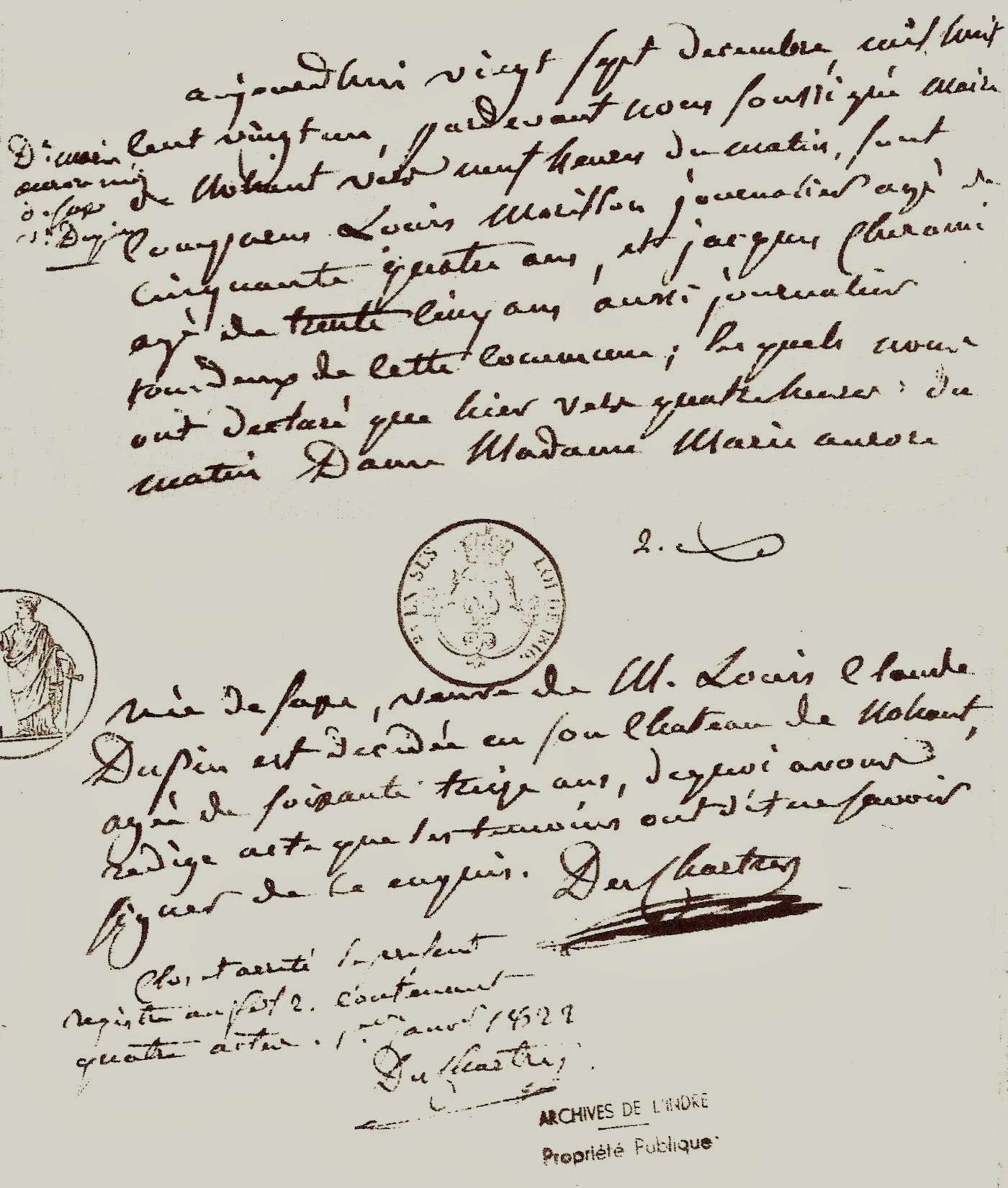
Death certificate of Marie-Aurore de Saxe, dated 26 December 1821 at the Château de Nohant.

Marie-Aurore had an attack of apoplexy at the end of February 1821. During the rest of the year, Aurore took care of her grandmother. Marie-Aurore de Saxe died at Nohant on 26 December 1821. Her last words were to her granddaughter: You lose your best friend. She was buried at Nohant next to her son. Her granddaughter and her descendants were later buried there.

== Marie-Aurore de Saxe by George Sand ==
In her autobiography, Histoire de ma vie, Sand describes the origins of her grandmother, Marie-Aurore de Saxe, after researching in archives and libraries. She cites in particular the judgment of the Parlement of Paris dated 15 May 1766 and the work of Jean-Baptiste Denisart, attorney at the Châtelet in Paris, Collection de décisions nouvelles et de notions relatives à la jurisprudence actuelle, in his edition of 1771, Volume III, page 704:

The demoiselle Marie-Aurore, natural daughter of Maurice, comte de Saxe, Marshal General of the camps and armies of France, was baptized as a daughter of Jean-Baptiste de la Rivière, citizen of Paris, and Marie Rinteau, his wife. When the demoiselle Aurore was close to marry, the Monsieur de Montglas was appointed her guardian by the sentence of the Châtelet, on 3 May 1766. There was troubles for the publication of marriage edicts, because the demoiselle Aurore wasn't to be name a daughter of Monsieur de la Rivière or a child of unknown parents. The demoiselle Aurore presented a petition to the court in order to modify the sentence of the Châtelet. The court, answering the request of demoiselle Aurore, who provides full proofs, both testimony of Monsieur Gervais, who helped her mother to give birth, and persons who are present at the baptismal font, etc..., that she was the natural daughter of the comte du Saxe and he always known her for his daughter; Monsieur Massonet was appointed as the first tutor, and finally, following the consistent findings of Monsieur Joly de Fleury, General Counsel, on 4 June 1766, was made the decision to reversed the previous rule of 3 May; in consequence, Monsieur Giraud, prosecutor in the court, was chosen as the new tutor of demoiselle Aurore, in her position of natural daughter of Maurice, comte de Saxe, with the responsibility of maintained and kept that condition and possession thereunder; in so doing, ordered the baptismal act registered in the records of the parish of Saint-Gervais and Saint-Protais of Paris, on the date of 19 October 1748, said extract containing: Marie-Aurore, girl, presented to the said day to baptism by Antoine-Alexandre Colbert, Marquis of Sourdis, and Geneviève Rinteau, godparents, will be amended and, instead of Jean-Baptiste de la Rivière, citizen of Paris, and Marie Rinteau, his wife, who followed the name of Marie-Aurore, daughter, will be added these words: natural of Maurice, comte de Saxe, Marshal General of the camps and armies of France, and Marie Rinteau; and by the bailiff of our said court bearer of this judgment, etc...

This book was later reprinted with updates and notable corrections. In the 1874 edition Sand also specified the father of Marie-Aurore de Saxe, Marshal Maurice de Saxe:

Another irrefutable proof that my grandmother would have claimed before public opinion, it's the proved resemblance that she had with the Marshal de Saxe, and the kind of adoption that made her the Dauphine, daughter of King Augustus, niece of the Marshal, mother of Charles X and Louis XVIII. This princess placed her in Saint-Cyr and took charge of her education and her marriage, telling her to see defense and attend her mother. At fifteen, Aurore de Saxe left St. Cyr to be married to the comte de Horn, bastard of Louis XV and the king's lieutenant at Schelestadt. She saw him for the first time on the eve of her wedding and had great fear, thinking she saw the walking portrait of the late king, because the comte looked fearfully exactly to him.

== Bibliography ==
- Nathalie Desgrugillers: Ma grand-mère Marie Aurore de Saxe : Correspondance inédite et souvenirs, Clermont-Ferrand, ed Paleo, coll. "La collection de sable", 15 June 2011, 178 p.
- Christophe Grandemange: Le château de Nohant : Maison de George Sand, Saint-Cyr-sur-Loire, ed. Alan Sutton, coll. "Provinces Mosaïques", 14 June 2010, 160 p.
- Anne-Marie Aubin: Correspondance entre Marie-Aurore de Saxe et Monsieur de Scévole, in Argenton et son histoire, nº 21, 2004, pp. 15–17, Cercle d'histoire d'Argenton, Argenton-sur-Creuse.
- Gilles Lapouge: Les Folies Koenigsmark, Paris, Éditions Albin Michel, 29 August 1989, 350 p. online, chap. XXXI, p. 300.
- Roger Pierrot, Jacques Lethève, Marie-Laure Prévost, Michel Brunet and the Bibliothèque nationale de France (dir.) (preface by Georges Le Rider): George Sand : visages du romantisme, Paris, Bibliothèque nationale de France, coll. "Catalogue d'exposition", 20 January 1977, 208 p. (BnF nº FRBNF34702163, online).
- Robert Ranjard: Le secret de Chenonceau, Tours, ed. Gibert-Clarey, 8 June 1976 (1st ed. 1950), 256 p., "Monsieur et madame Dupin", pp. 177–210.
- Thérèse Marix-Spire: Les romantiques et la musique : le cas George Sand, vol. I, Paris, Nouvelles Éditions Latines, 1954 (reprinted 20 January 2008), 714 p. online, "George Sand et la musique, influences lointaines", p. 70.
- Lucien Perey and Gaston Maugras: La jeunesse de madame d'Épinay : d'après des lettres et des documents inédits, Paris, ed. Calmann-Lévy, 1898, 588 p. online, chap. XII: "Les demoiselles Verrière à Épinay", p. 381.
- Jean-François Marmontel (prface by. Maurice Tourneux): Mémoires de Marmontel : Mémoires d'un Père pour servir à l'Instruction de ses enfans, vol. I, t. I, Paris, La Librairie des Bibliophiles, 1891 (1st ed. 1800), 330 p. online, chap. Livre IV: "Liaisons de Mademoiselle Marie Verrière", p. 221.
- Gaston Maugras: Les demoiselles de Verrières, Paris, ed. Calmann-Lévy, 1890, 276 p. online.
- Émile Campardon: Les prodigalités d'un fermier général : compléments aux mémoires de Madame d'Épinay, Paris, ed. Charavay frères, 1882, 172 p. online, "Les demoiselles de Verrières".
- Adolphe Jullien: Le théâtre des demoiselles Verrières, vol. VIII, t. I : La Chronique Musicale de l'art ancien et moderne, Paris, ed. La Chronique Musicale, April to June 1875, 322 p. online, chap. I and II, pp. 224–231 and 252–263.
- René Louis de Voyer de Paulmy d'Argenson: Journal et mémoires du marquis d'Argenson, vol. V, Paris, ed. Vve Jules Renouard, 1863, 532 p. online, "Novembre 1748", p. 280.
- George Sand: Histoire de ma vie, t. I, Paris, ed. Calmann-Lévy, 15 April 1847 (1st ed. 1856), 508 p. online, chap. II: "Aurore de Saxe", pp. 33–34.
- Jean-Baptiste Denisart, Armand-Gaston Camus and Jean-Baptiste François Bayard: Collection de décisions nouvelles et de notions relatives à la jurisprudence actuelle, vol. 3, Paris, ed. Veuve Desaint, 1784, 822 p. online, « Bâtard § II », pp. 276–277.
