= Maurice Dupin de Francueil =

French army officer

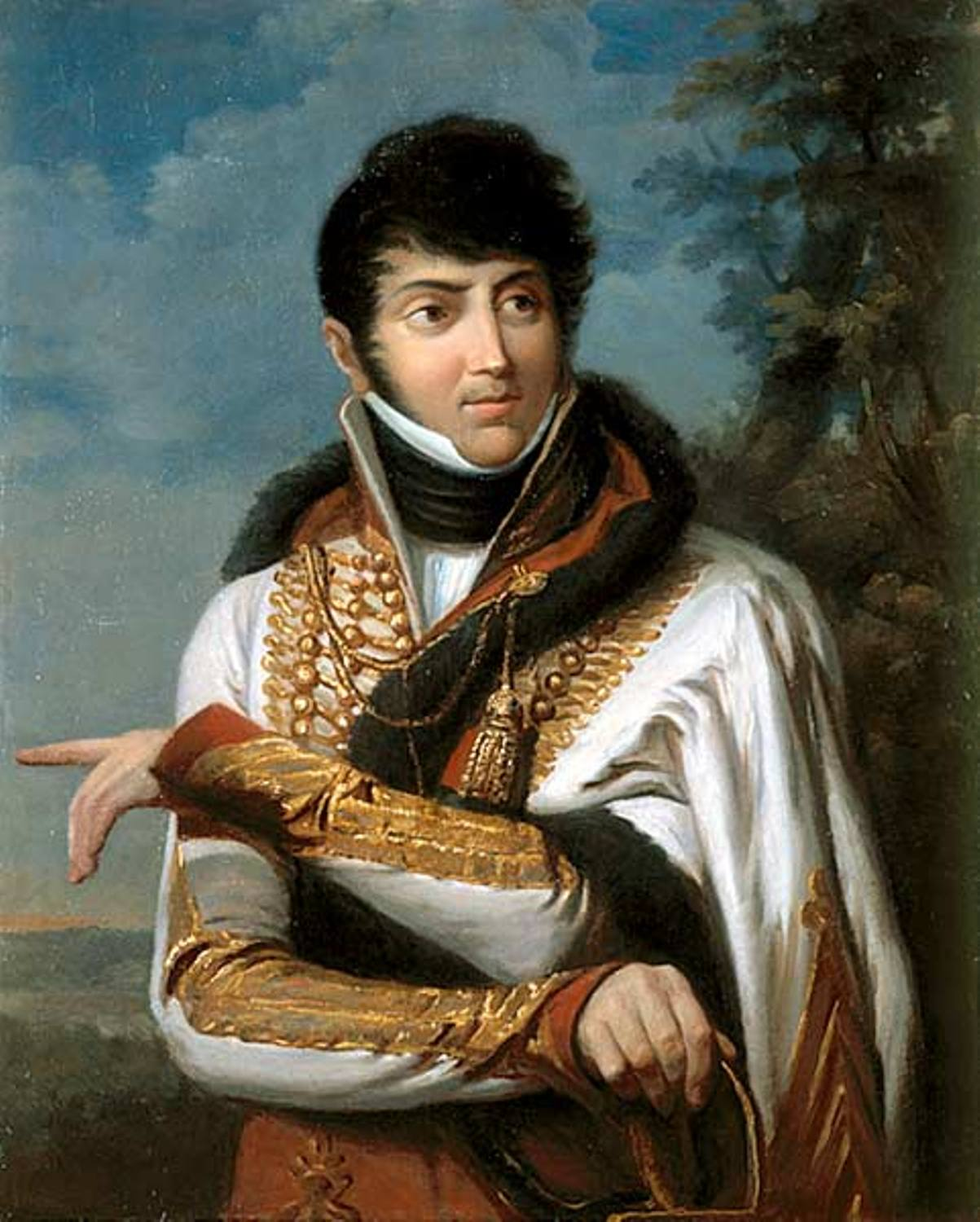
Anonymous portrait of Maurice Dupin in imperial army officer uniform (Domaine de Nohant-Vic).

Maurice François Élisabeth Dupin de Francueil (9 January 1778 – 16 September 1808) was a French army officer, father of Aurore Dupin de Francueil, baroness Dudevant, better known as George Sand.

== Archival sources ==
- Département de l'Indre :
  Domaine de George-Sand - Place du Château 36400 Nohant-Vic.
  Musée George Sand - 71 rue Venôse 36400 La Châtre.
  Archives Départementales de l'Indre - 1 rue Jeanne d'Arc 36000 Châteauroux.
  Archives municipales - Mairie de La Châtre. Place de l'Hôtel de Ville 36400 La Châtre.
- Département de Paris :
  Archives de Paris - Archives de l'État civil - 18 boulevard Sérurier 75019 Paris.
  Bibliothèque nationale de France - Quai François Mauriac 75706 Paris Cedex 13.
  Service historique de la Défense - Château de Vincennes avenue de Paris 94306 Vincennes Cedex.
  Fondation Napoléon - 7 rue Geoffroy Saint-Hilaire 75005 Paris.
  Le Souvenir napoléonien - 82 rue de Monceau 75008 Paris.

== Bibliography (in French) ==
- Grandemange, Christophe (1 October 2013). George Sand. Mémoire en Images. Saint-Cyr-sur-Loire: Éditions Alan Sutton. ISBN 978-2-8138-0671-0.
- Desgrugillers, Nathalie (15 June 2011). Ma grand-mère Marie Aurore de Saxe: Correspondance inédite et souvenirs. La collection de sable (in French). Clermont-Ferrand: Éditions Paleo. ISBN 978-2-84909-636-9.
- Virlogeux, Louis (23 September 2005). "17 Antoine Collin-Lacombe, avoué gannatois a marié Bonaparte". Si Gannat m'était conté - Profils et silhouettes. Histoire. Nonette (Puy-de-Dôme): Éditions Créer. p. 53 à 54. ISBN 978-2-84819-048-8.
- Bernard Jouve (preface by Georges Buisson), Les racines de George Sand : de Chenonceau à Nohant, Saint-Cyr-sur-Loire, Éditions Alan Sutton, coll. « Histoire et archéologie », 6 octobre 2004, 222 p. (ISBN 978-2-84910-130-8)
- Joseph Valynseele and Denis Grando (preface by Alain Decaux), À la découverte de leurs racines, vol. 2, Paris, Éditions L'Intermédiaire des chercheurs et curieux, 1994, 236 p. (ISBN 978-2-908003-03-1).
- Georges Lubin, « George Sand et les Bonaparte », Revue du Souvenir Napoléonien, no 309, January 1980, p. 5-24
- Gaston Imbault, Lauriers et amours de Maurice Dupin : petit-fils du maréchal de Saxe et père de George Sand, Éditions des Cahiers bourbonnais, 1976, 43 p.
- Robert Ranjard, Le secret de Chenonceau, Tours, Éditions Gibert-Clarey, 8 juin 1976 (1st edition 1950), 256 p., « Monsieur et madame Dupin », p. 177 to 210.
- Louis du Pin de Beyssat, Généalogie de la maison Du Pin : du xe au xxe siècle, Châteauroux, Imprimerie Badel, 1er septembre 1908, 130 p.
- George Sand, Histoire de ma vie, volumes 1-4, Paris, Éditions Michel Lévy frères, 1847 - 1848 (1st edition 1856) (BNF 36414323)
