= Louise d'Épinay =

French writer (1726–1783)

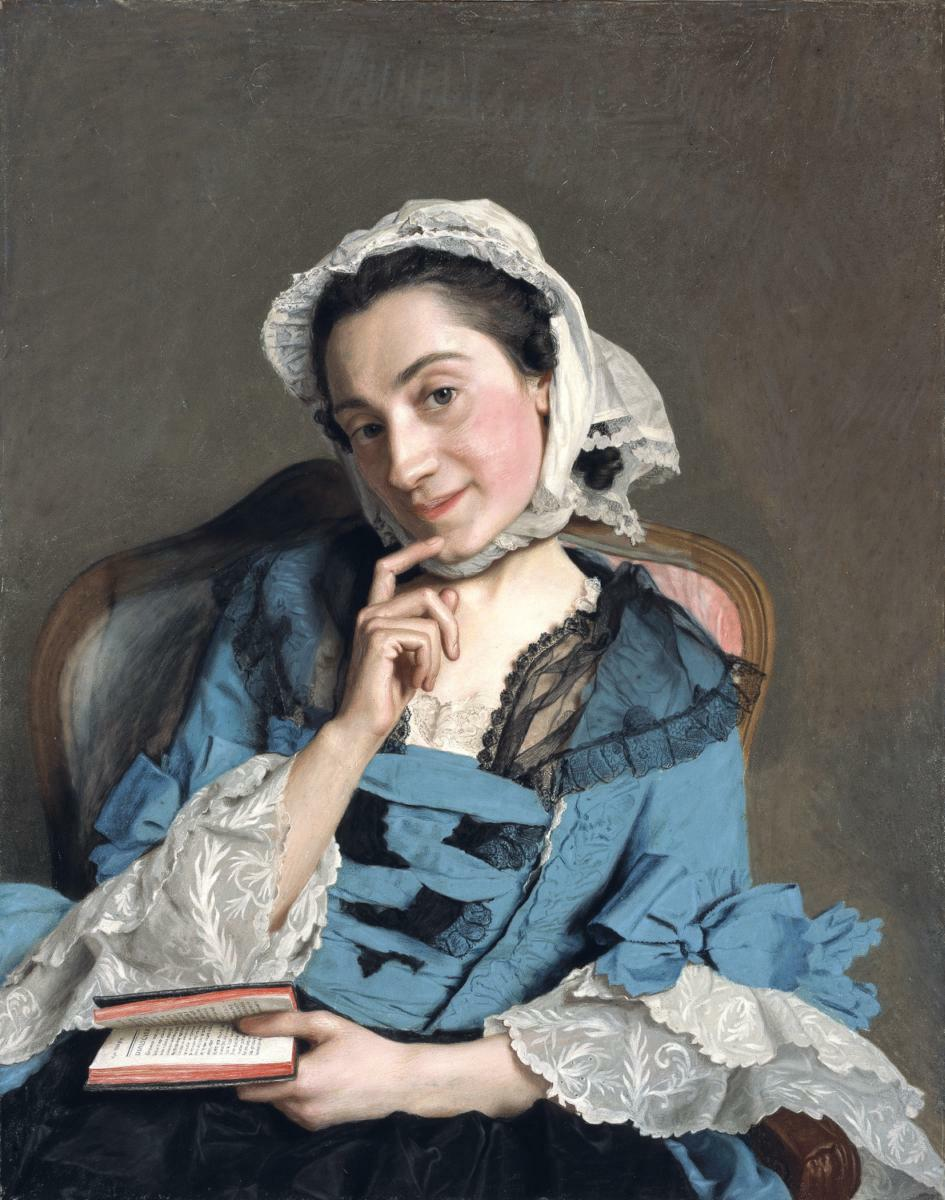
Mme d'Épinay by Jean-Étienne Liotard, ca 1759 (Musée d'art et d'histoire, Geneva)

Louise Florence Pétronille Tardieu d'Esclavelles d'Épinay (11 March 1726 – 17 April 1783), better known as Mme d'Épinay, was a French writer, a saloniste and woman of fashion, known on account of her liaisons with Friedrich Melchior, Baron von Grimm, and Jean-Jacques Rousseau, who gives unflattering reports of her in his Confessions, as well as her acquaintanceship with Denis Diderot, Jean le Rond d'Alembert, Baron d'Holbach and other French men of letters during the Enlightenment. She was also one of many women referenced in Simone de Beauvoir's The Second Sex as an example of noble expansion of women's rights during the 18th century.

== Early life ==
Louise d'Épinay

Louise d'Épinay was born at the fortress of Valenciennes. She was the daughter of Tardieu d'Esclavelles (1666–1736), a brigadier of infantry and commanding officer, and Florence-Angélique Prouveur (1695–1762). After her father was killed in battle when she was ten, she was sent to Paris in the care of her aunt Marie-Josèphe Prouveur who was married to Louis-Denis de La Live de Bellegarde, an immensely wealthy fermier-général, a collector-general of taxes; treated to the stultifying education that was a girl's lot, on 23 December 1745 she married her cousin Denis Joseph de La Live d'Épinay, (Note: The seigneurie of Épinay, on the Seine close to Paris, had been purchased by M. La Live de Bellegarde in 1742 (Steegmuller 1991:8).) who was made a fermier-général, a tax collector. (Note: His brother Ange-Laurant La Live de Jully, also a fermier-général, was a connoisseur and patron of the arts, who embraced the early form of neoclassicism called the Goût grec.)

The marriage was at once an unhappy one; and the prodigality, dissipation and infidelities of her husband justified her in obtaining a formal separation of assets (Note: Though not a physical separation, séparation des corps which would have generated scandal (Steegmuller 1991:14).) in May 1749. She settled in the Château of La Chevrette in the valley of Montmorency, a few miles north of Paris, and there received a number of distinguished visitors.

== Liaisons ==
She was introduced to Jean-Jacques Rousseau by her lover Louis Dupin de Francueil. Conceiving a strong attachment for Rousseau, she furnished for him in 1756 in the valley of Montmorency a cottage which she named the Hermitage, and in this retreat he found for a time the quiet and natural rural pleasures he praised so highly. Rousseau, in his Confessions, asserted that the inclination was all on her side; but as, after her visit to Geneva (1757–1759), Rousseau became her bitter enemy, little weight can be given to his statements on this point. Her association with Rousseau, was brief and stormy: in 1756 he accepted her offer of accommodation in the "Hermitage," a small dwelling near her country house, and wrote his novel La Nouvelle Héloïse there. But then he quarreled with his hostess, and the two became implacable foes.

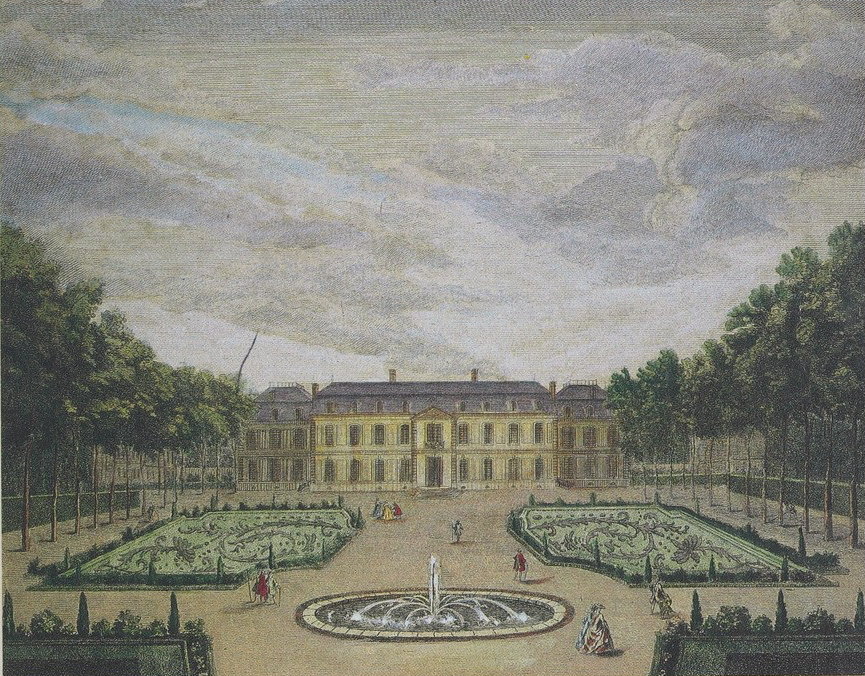
Le Château de la Chevrette in Deuil-la-Barre

Her intimacy with Grimm, which began in 1755, marks a turning-point in her life, for under his influence she escaped from the somewhat compromising conditions of her life at La Chevrette. In 1757–1759, she paid a long visit to Geneva, where she was a constant guest of Voltaire. In Grimm's absence from France (1775–1776), Madame d'Épinay continued, under the superintendence of Diderot, the correspondence he had begun with various European sovereigns. She spent most of her later life at La Briche, a small house near La Chevrette, in the society of Grimm and of a small circle of men of letters. One notable guest was Mozart who stayed at the home for two months in 1778 where he was welcomed by both Grimm and d’Épinay. Her friendship with Grimm was long and untroubled, and Mme d’Épinay collaborated with him on his famous correspondence.

== L'Histoire de Madame de Montbrillant ==
Her pseudo-memoires are written in the form of a sort of autobiographic romance, L'Histoire de Madame de Montbrillant, begun when she was thirty but never published in her lifetime. It intersperses fictionalized set pieces exhibiting the sensibilité of the earliest generation of Romantics, with genuine letters and autobiographical material. Bequeathed to Baron Grimm, a mangled version of the manuscript was edited by J. P. A. Parison and J. C. Brunet (Paris, 1818) as Mémoires et correspondence de Madame d'Épinay with all the names changed to identify the supposed originals: Madame d'Épinay figures in it as Madame de Montbrillant, and René is generally recognized as Rousseau, Volx as Grimm, Gamier as Diderot, who is sometimes credited with major interventions in the text. The work has had a checkered career since. The only accurate edition is George Roth, ed. Les Pseudo-mémoires de Madame d'Épinay, 3 vols., 1951.

== Other works ==
Her Conversations d'Émilie, a dialogue recollecting the education of her granddaughter, Émilie de Belsunce, was published in 1774. The Mémoires et Correspondance de Mme d'Épinay, renfermant un grand nombre de lettres inédites de Grimm, de Diderot, et de J.-J. Rousseau, ainsi que des details, &c., was published at Paris (1818) from a manuscript which she had bequeathed to Grimm.

Many of Madame d'Épinay's letters are contained in the Correspondance de l'abbé Galiani (1818), which provided material for Francis Steegmuller's joint biography, and have since appeared in a definitive redaction. Two anonymous works, Lettres à mon fils (Geneva, 1758) and Mes moments heureux (Geneva, 1759), are also by Madame d'Épinay.

In January 1783, three months before her death, she was awarded the Prix Monyon, recently established by the Académie to honour the author of the "book published in the current year that might be of most benefit to society"; it was her Conversations d'Émilie (1774).

== Issue ==
- Louis-Joseph de La Live d'Épinay (25 September 1746 – 10 April 1813), a military, editor and musician.
- Françoise-Suzanne-Thérèse de La Live d'Épinay (24 August 1747 – 3 June 1748), died in infancy.
- Angélique-Louise-Charlotte de La Live d'Épinay (1 August 1749 – 1 June 1824), recognized by Denis d'Épinay as his own, but she probably was a product of her mother's affair with Louis Dupin de Francueil.
- Jean-Claude Leblanc de Beaulieu (29 May 1753 – 13 July 1825), also a child of Louis Dupin, he was sent to the countryside and entered in church. He later was Bishop of Soissons and Arles.

== See also ==
- Conversation tart
