= Nohant-Vic =

- Commune
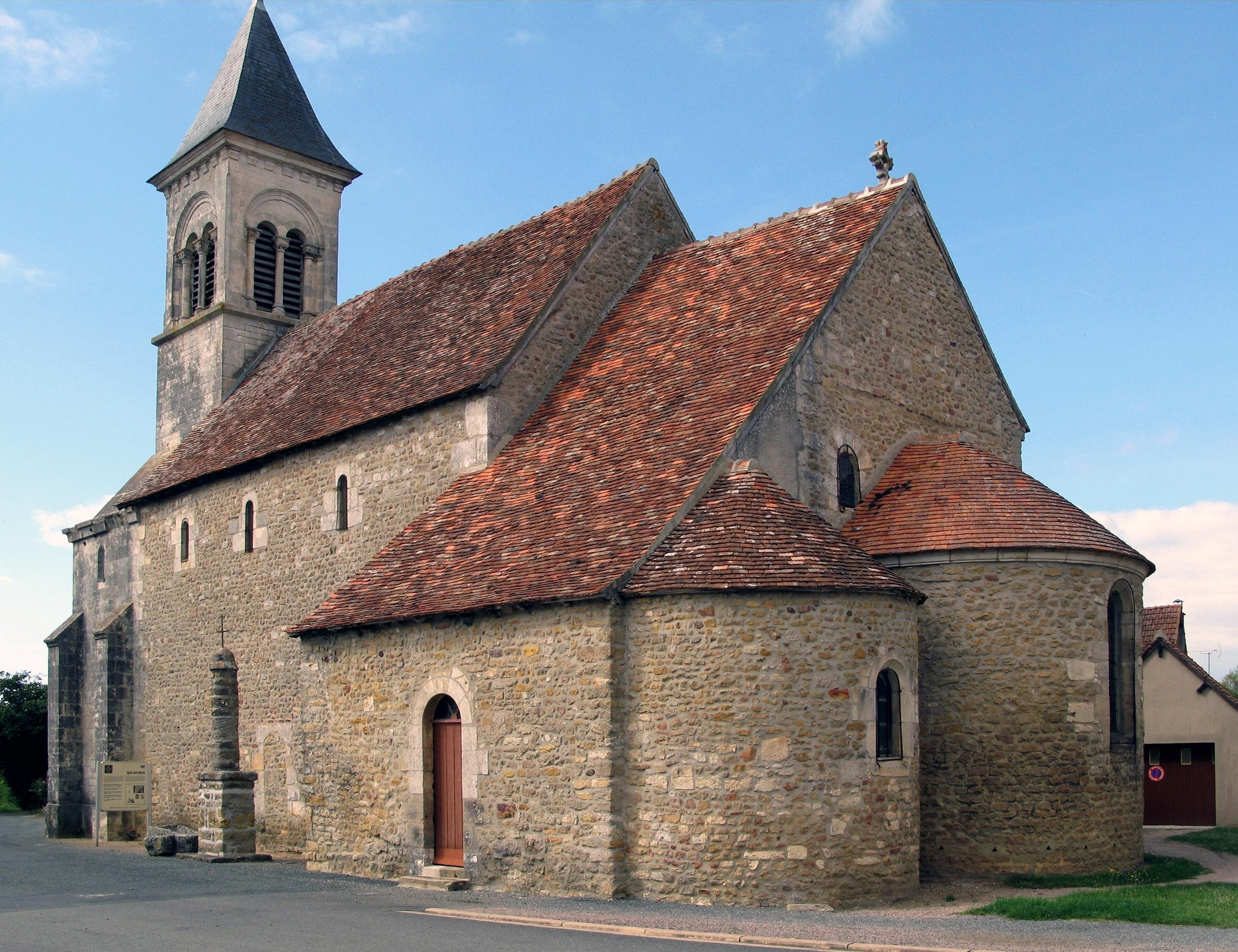
- The Church of Saint-Martin, in Vic
- Location of Nohant-Vic
- Location within France Location within Centre-Val de Loire
- Coordinates: 46°38′22″N 1°57′38″E
- Country: France
- Region: Centre-Val de Loire
- Department: Indre
- Arrondissement: La Châtre
- Canton: La Châtre

Government
  - Mayor (2020–2026): Patrick Nonin
- Area^{1}: 21.25 km^{2} (8.20 sq mi)
- Elevation: 191 m (627 ft)
- Highest elevation: 261 m (856 ft)
- Lowest elevation: 175 m (574 ft)
- Population (2023): 450
  - Density: 21/km^{2} (55/sq mi)
- Time zone: UTC+01:00 (CET)
  - Summer (DST): UTC+02:00 (CEST)
- INSEE/Postal code: 36143 /36400
- ^{1} French Land Register data, which excludes lakes, ponds, glaciers > 1 km^{2} (0.386 sq mi or 247 acres) and river estuaries.

Nohant-Vic (French pronunciation: [nɔ.ɑ̃ vik]) is a commune in the Indre department in central France.

It is located near La Châtre, on the D943, approximately 36 km (22 mi) southeast of Châteauroux and consists of two villages, Vic and Nohant, extended along the road.

== Geography ==
The commune lies on the lower Jurassic rocks at the southern margin of the Paris Basin. Just to the south of La Châtre, some twelve kilometres south of Vic, the Variscan-faulted rocks of the Massif Central begin with Cambrian/Ordovician migmatite.

It is near the southern end of the old province of Berry.

== Population ==
Historical population
Year	Pop.	±% p.a.
1968	608	—
1975	514	−2.37%
1982	480	−0.97%
1990	481	+0.03%
1999	500	+0.43%
2007	475	−0.64%
2012	490	+0.62%
2017	450	−1.69%
2023	450	+0.00%
Source: INSEE

== Sights ==
The House of George Sand is a country house dating from late eighteenth century, built for the governor of Vierzon and acquired in 1793 by Madame Dupin de Francueil, grandmother of the writer. George Sand spent her childhood and adolescence there. Most of her writing was done at the house. She received some illustrious guests including Liszt and Marie d'Agoult, Balzac, Chopin and Flaubert. Delacroix also worked at Nohant while visiting George Sand. The estate is today a property of the nation and run by the Centre des monuments nationaux.

The ancient church of Saint-Martin in Nohant-Vic features a number of 12th century wall paintings.

== Personalities ==
- Marie-Aurore de Saxe (1748–1821), daughter of the Maréchal de Saxe, who bought the Nohant estate in 1793.
- Aurore Dupin, known as George Sand (1804–1876), granddaughter of the above, who spent most of her life at Nohant.
- Frédéric Chopin (March 1, 1810 – October 17, 1849) spent seven summers in Nohant and composed some of his greatest works in George Sand's estate.

== See also ==
- Saint-Benoît-du-Sault
- Communes of the Indre department
