= Robert Ranjard =

French physician and archaeologist (1881-1960)

- Born: Marie Louis Robert Ranjard; January 13, 1881; Montrichard
- Died: May 28, 1960 (aged 79); Tours
- Occupations: Physician, archaeologist
- Spouse: Marguerite Courselles-Dumont
- Children: 2
- Awards: Prix Montyon (1935); Knight of the Legion of Honour (1953)

Robert Ranjard (born Marie Louis Robert Ranjard; 13 January 1881 – 28 May 1960) was a French physician and archaeologist.

== Biography ==
Robert Ranjard was born on 13 January 1881 in Montrichard, Loir-et-Cher, where his father operated a notary's office. In 1898, after spending ten years in Blois where he attended the Collège Augustin-Thierry, his family relocated to Tours. At the age of 17, he enrolled in the medical school in Tours. He later pursued advanced studies in otolaryngology in Paris, where he married Marguerite Courselles-Dumont on 29 November 1905 in the 6th arrondissement of Paris. Upon qualifying as a physician, he settled permanently in Tours, practicing medicine there until 1940.

In 1919, Ranjard joined the Société archéologique de Touraine, serving as its president from 1940 to 1949. He played a key role in identifying the remains discovered during 1933 excavations at the Prieuré de Saint-Cosme as those of the poet Pierre de Ronsard. Both before and after World War II, Ranjard was instrumental in inventorying Touraine's cultural heritage. He alerted authorities to its deteriorating condition and decried what he termed "archaeological vandalism" accompanying certain post-war reconstructions.

In 1948, Ranjard suffered an accident that forced him to gradually curtail his activities. Paralyzed thereafter, he died on 28 May 1960 at his home at 26 rue Bernard Palissy in Tours. He was buried in the Saint-Symphorien Cemetery. Ranjard had two sons: Michel, who became an Architecte des Bâtiments de France, and Claude, a medical doctor.

== Honours and tributes ==
In 1935, Ranjard received the Prix Montyon from the Académie Française for his work Sur les pas de saint Martin. He was appointed a Knight of the Legion of Honour in October 1953.

A street in Tours' Sanitas neighbourhood is named after him.

== Selected publications ==
A more comprehensive list of Robert Ranjard's publications is available on the Académie de Touraine website.

- Le vertige auriculaire [Vertigo caused by ear problems] (Thèse de médecine) (in French). Paris: H. Jouve. 1905. p. 138.
- La surdité organique: Étude clinique et thérapeutique [Organic deafness: Clinical and therapeutic study] (in French). Paris: J.-B. Baillière et fils. 1912. pp. VIII, 279.
- La Touraine archéologique: Guide du Touriste en Indre-et-Loire [Archeological Touraine: Tourist Guide to Indre-et-Loire] (in French) (1st ed.). Tours: J. Maillocheau. 1930. p. 656. (multiple revised and expanded editions)
- Sur les pas de saint Martin [In the footsteps of Saint Martin] (in French). Tours: Deslis. 1934. p. 150.
- "Le prieuré de Saint-Cosme" [The Priory of Saint-Cosme]. Congrès archéologique de France, 106^{e} session tenue à Tours en 1948 (in French). Paris: Société française d'archéologie: 264–267. 1949.
- Le secret de Chenonceau [The secret of Chenonceau] (in French). Tours: Éditions Gibert-Clarey. June 8, 1950. p. 256.

== See also ==
- List of archaeologists
- List of physicians
- Pierre de Ronsard
- Société archéologique de Touraine
- Martin of Tours
- Tours

== Bibliography ==
- Laurencin, Michel (1990). Dictionnaire biographique de Touraine [Biographical Dictionary of Touraine] (in French). Chambray-lès-Tours: CLD. ISBN 2-85443-210-X.
- Philippon, Albert (1960). "Le docteur Robert Ranjard". Bulletin de la Société archéologique de Touraine: 261–269. Archived from the original on December 23, 2017.
- Académie des Sciences, Arts et Belles-Lettres de Touraine (2017). Dictionnaire des scientifiques de Touraine [Dictionary of Scientists from Touraine] (in French). Tours: Académie des sciences, arts et belles-lettres de Touraine. ISBN 978-2-86906-433-1.
