= George Sand =

French novelist and memoirist (1804–1876)

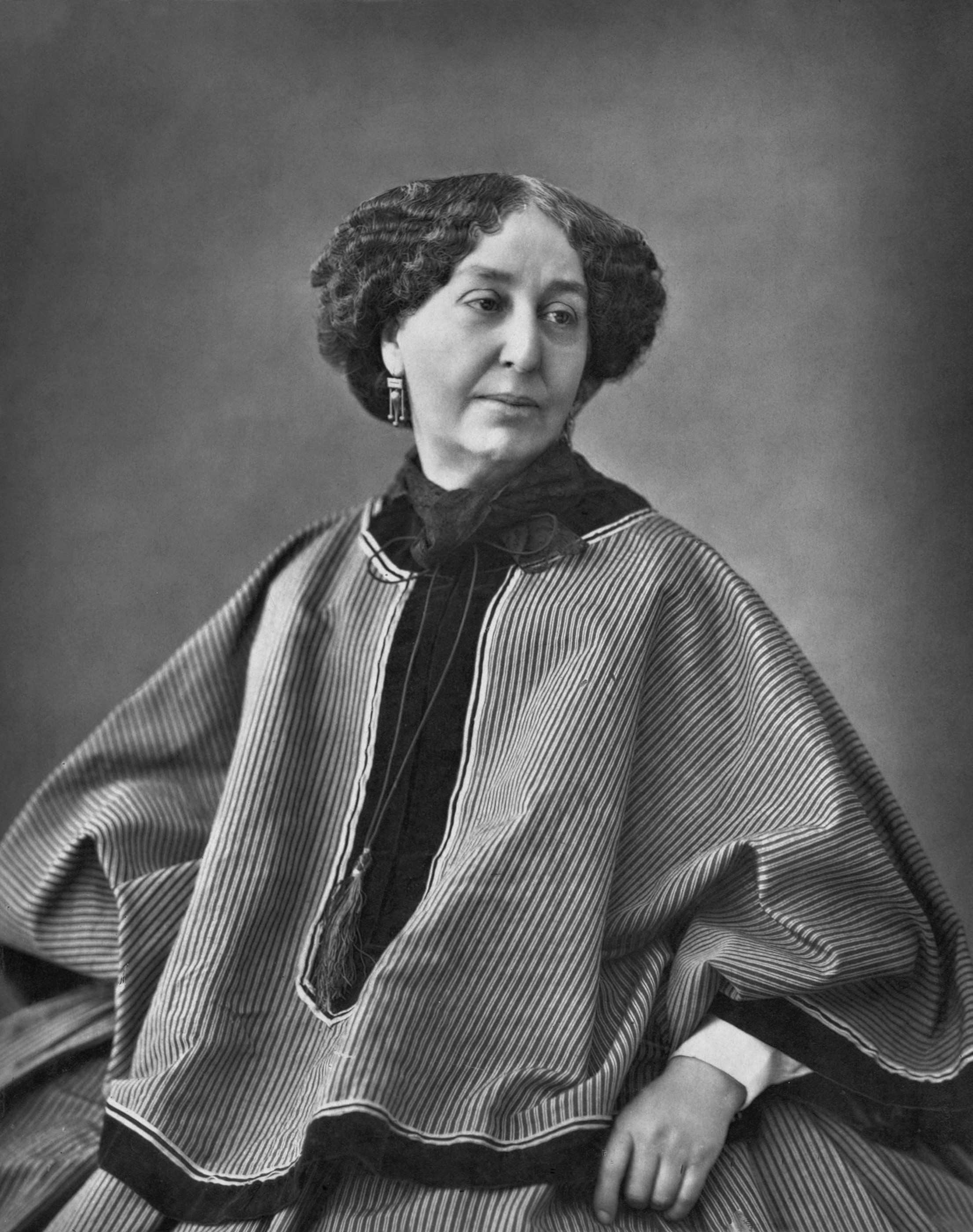
- 1864 portrait
- Born: Amantine Lucile Aurore Dupin; 1 July 1804; Paris, France
- Died: 8 June 1876 (aged 71); Nohant-Vic, Berry, France
- Occupation: Novelist
- Movement: Pastoralism
- Spouse: Casimir Dudevant (m. 1822; sep. 1835)
- Children: Maurice Sand; Solange Dudevant

Amantine Lucile Aurore Dupin de Francueil (French: [amɑ̃tin lysil oʁɔʁ dypɛ̃]; 1 July 1804 – 8 June 1876), best known by her pen name George Sand (French: [ʒɔʁʒ(ə) sɑ̃d]), was a French novelist, memoirist and journalist. Being more renowned than either Victor Hugo or Honoré de Balzac in Britain in the 1830s and 1840s, Sand is recognised as one of the most notable writers of the European Romantic era. She has more than 50 volumes of various works to her credit, including tales, plays and political texts, alongside her 70 novels.

Like her step great-grandmother, Louise Dupin, whom she admired, George Sand advocated for women's rights and passion, criticized the institution of marriage, and fought against the prejudices of a conservative society. She was considered scandalous because of her turbulent love life, her adoption of masculine clothing, and her masculine pseudonym.

== Personal life ==
=== Childhood ===
Amantine Lucile Aurore Dupin, the future George Sand, was born on 1 July 1804 on rue Meslay in Paris to Maurice Dupin de Francueil (grandson of Claude Dupin) and Sophie-Victoire Delaborde. She was the paternal great-granddaughter of the Marshal of France Maurice de Saxe, and on her mother's side, her grandfather was Antoine Delaborde, master paumier and master birder. For much of her childhood, she was raised by her grandmother Marie-Aurore de Saxe, Madame Dupin de Francueil, at her grandmother's house in the village of Nohant, in the French province of Berry. Sand inherited the house in 1821 when her grandmother died, and used the setting in many of her novels.

=== Gender presentation ===
Sand was one of many notable 19th-century women who chose to wear male attire in public. In 1800, the police chief of Paris issued an order requiring women to apply for a “transvestite pass” in order to wear male clothing. Some women applied for health, occupational, or recreational reasons (e.g., horse riding), although many women chose to wear trousers and other traditional male attire in public without having a permit. Sand obtained a permit in 1831, justifying her clothing as being less expensive and far more robust than the typical dress of a noblewoman at the time. In addition to being comfortable, Sand's male attire enabled her to circulate more freely in Paris than most of her female contemporaries and gave her increased access to venues that barred women, even those of her social standing. Sand's smoking tobacco in public was also considered scandalous; neither peerage nor gentry had yet sanctioned the free indulgence by women of such a habit, especially in public, although Franz Liszt's paramour Marie d'Agoult affected this as well, smoking large cigars.

While some contemporaries were critical of her comportment, many people accepted her behaviour until they became shocked by the subversive tone of her novels. Those who found her writing admirable were not bothered by her ambiguous or rebellious public behaviour.

In 1831, at the age of 27, she chose her pseudonym George Sand. "Sand" was derived from the name of her lover and fellow writer Jules Sandeau, as the pair had previously co-authored a novel under the pseudonym J. Sand. She added George to complete the name and distinguish it from Sandeau's, removing the final "s" from the usual French spelling of the name to heighten its ambiguity as a pseudonym.

Victor Hugo commented, "George Sand cannot determine whether she is male or female. I entertain a high regard for all my colleagues, but it is not my place to decide whether she is my sister or my brother."

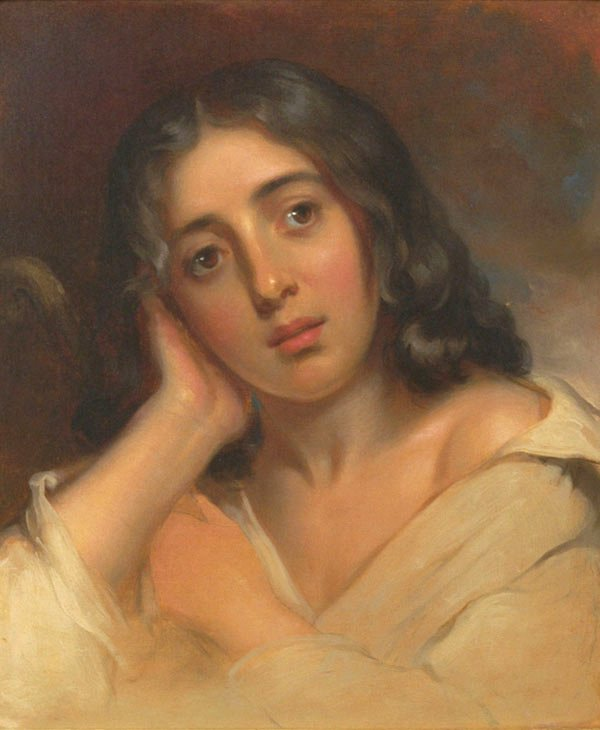
Portrait of George Sand by Thomas Sully, 1826

Similarly, gender appears to be ambiguous in Sand's own perspective. When writing first-person memoirs or essays (including letters and journals), Sand's language sometimes "speaks to modern explorations of gender ambiguity" in the consistent use of a first-person "male persona" used to describe Sand's own experiences and identity in masculine terms. However, when writing an autobiography of the author's youth, the person described is a girl/woman whose descriptions aligns with her legal designation as "la demoiselle Aurora."

Sand's friends and peers likewise alternate between using masculine or female adjectives and pronouns depending on the situation. For instance, in reviewing the collected letters of Sand's lover Chopin, one finds her consistently addressed as either "Mme Sand" or more familiarly as "George". Either way, she is referred to with feminine pronouns, and positioned as the "Lady of the House" when referring to their domestic life together. However, when speaking of Sand as a public rather than a private figure, even those who clearly knew (or even referenced) the writer's sex also tended to apply masculine terms when speaking of their role as an author. For instance Jules Janin describes Sand as the king of novelists (ie: "le roi des romanciers modernes") rather than as the queen. Likewise, Flaubert refers to Sand as being a dear master of their shared art (ie: "Chère Maitre"), using a masculine title to denote the masculine professional role, but a grammatically feminine adjective that acknowledges their legal or grammatical sex.

=== Notable relationships ===
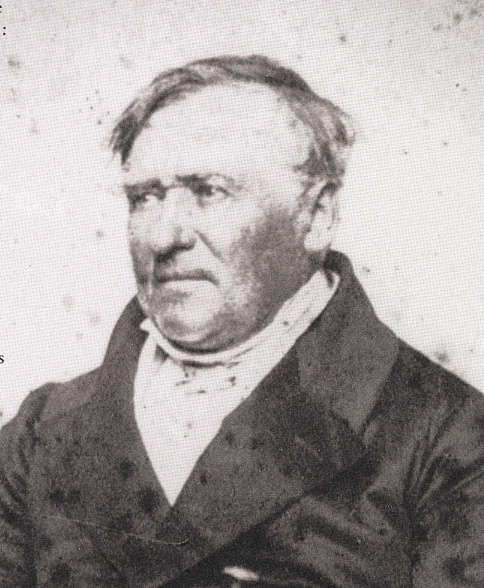
Casimir Dudevant, Sand's husband, in the 1860s

In 1822, at the age of eighteen, Sand married (François) Casimir Dudevant, an out-of-wedlock son of Baron Jean-François Dudevant. She and Dudevant had two children: Maurice and Solange (1828–1899). In 1825, she had an intense but perhaps platonic affair with the young lawyer Aurélien de Sèze. In early 1831, she left her husband and entered upon a four- or five-year period of "romantic rebellion". In 1835, she was legally separated from Dudevant and took custody of their children.

Sand had romantic affairs with the novelist Jules Sandeau (1831), the Polish-Russian Prince Norbert Przanowski (February 1832 – Summer 1833), the writer Prosper Mérimée, the dramatist Alfred de Musset (summer 1833 – March 1835), Louis-Chrysostome Michel, the actor Pierre-François Bocage, the writer Charles Didier, the novelist Félicien Mallefille, the politician Louis Blanc, and the composer Frédéric Chopin (1837–1847). Later in her life, she corresponded with Gustave Flaubert, and despite their differences in temperament and aesthetic preference, they eventually became close friends.

Sand was also close friends with the actress Marie Dorval. Whether they were physically involved or not has been debated, yet never verified. The two met in January 1833, after Sand wrote Dorval a letter of appreciation following one of her performances. Sand wrote about Dorval, including many passages where she is described as smitten with Dorval.

Only those who know how differently we were made can realize how utterly I was in thrall to her...God had given her the power to express what she felt...She was beautiful, and she was simple. She had never been taught anything, but there was nothing she did not know by instinct. I can find no words with which to describe how cold and incomplete my own nature is. I can express nothing. There must be a sort of paralysis in my brain which prevents what I feel from ever finding a form through which it can achieve communication...When she appeared upon the stage, with her drooping figure, her listless gait, her sad and penetrating glance...I can say only that it was as though I were looking at an embodied spirit.

Theater critic Gustave Planche reportedly warned Sand to stay away from Dorval. Likewise, Count Alfred de Vigny, Dorval's lover from 1831 to 1838, warned the actress to stay away from Sand, whom he referred to as "that damned lesbian". In 1840, Dorval played the lead in a play written by Sand, titled Cosima, and the two women collaborated on the script. However, the play was not well-received, and was cancelled after only seven showings. Sand and Dorval remained close friends for the remainder of Dorval's lifetime.

==== Chopin ====
Sand spent the winter of 1838–1839 with Frédéric Chopin in Mallorca at the (formerly abandoned) Carthusian monastery of Valldemossa. The trip to Mallorca was described in her Un hiver à Majorque (A Winter in Majorca), first published in 1841. Chopin was already ill with incipient tuberculosis at the beginning of their relationship, and spending a cold and wet winter in Mallorca where they could not get proper lodgings exacerbated his symptoms.

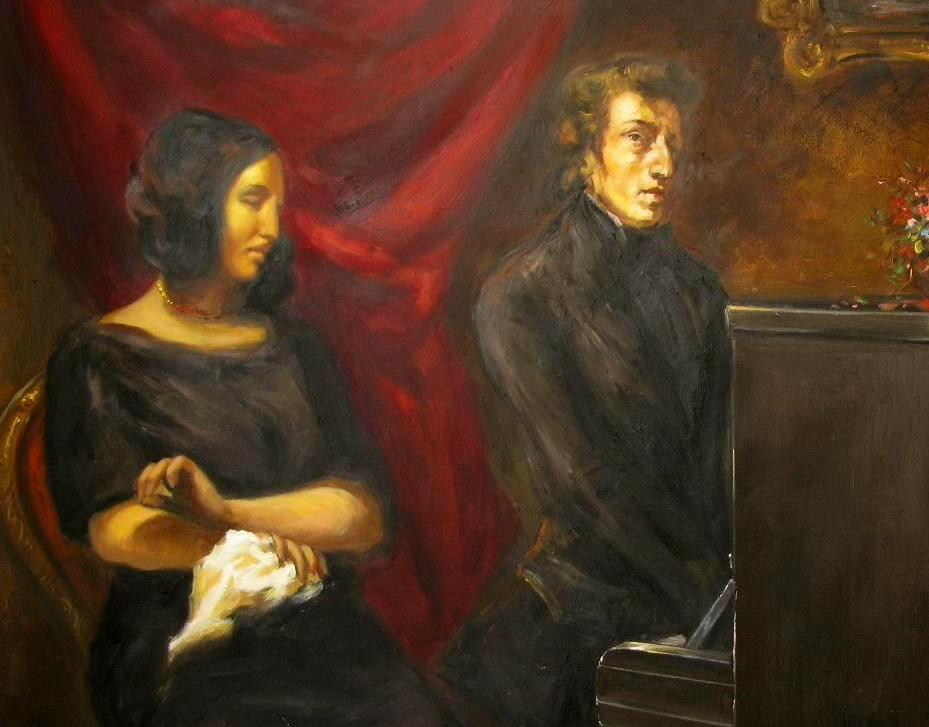
Sand sews while Chopin plays piano, in a hypothetical reconstruction of Delacroix's 1838 painting, Portrait of Frédéric Chopin and George Sand.

Sand and Chopin also spent many long summers at Sand's country manor in Nohant from 1839 to 1846, skipping only 1840. There, Chopin wrote many of his most famous works, including the Fantaisie in F minor, Op. 49, Piano Sonata No. 3, Op. 58, and the Ballade No. 3 Op. 47.

In her novel Lucrezia Floriani, Sand is said to have used Chopin as a model for a sickly Eastern European prince named Karol. He is cared for by a middle-aged actress past her prime, Lucrezia, who suffers greatly through her affection for Karol. Though Sand claimed not to have made a cartoon out of Chopin, the book's publication and widespread readership may have exacerbated their later antipathy towards each other. After Chopin's death, Sand burned much of their correspondence, leaving only four surviving letters between the two. Three of the letters were published in the "Classiques Garnier" series in 1968.

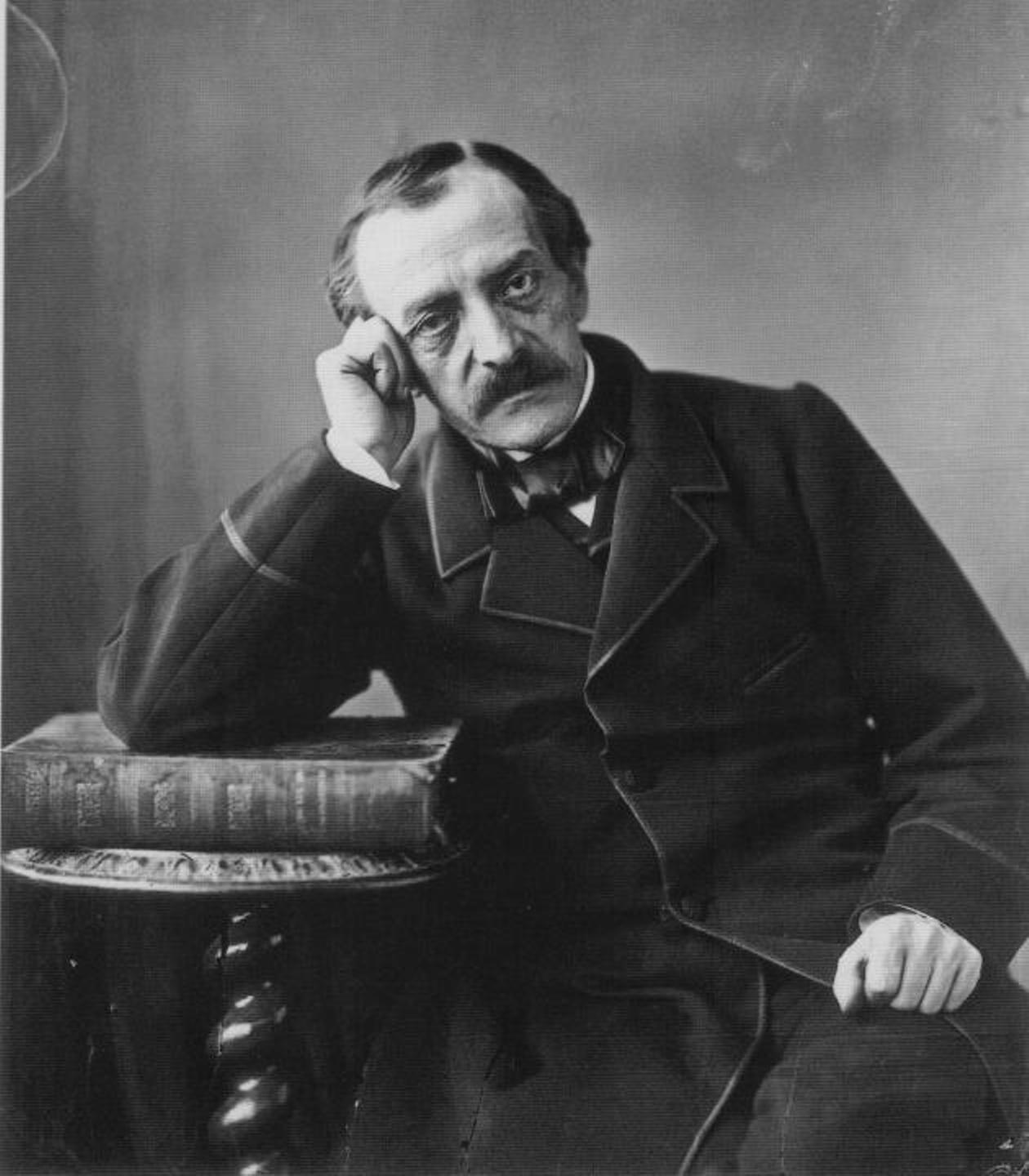
Alexandre Manceau (1817–1865), long time lover of George Sand from 1849 to 1865

Another breach was caused by Chopin's attitude toward Sand's daughter, Solange. Chopin continued to be cordial to Solange after she and her husband Auguste Clésinger fell out with Sand over money. Sand took Chopin's support of Solange to be extremely disloyal, and confirmation that Chopin had always "loved" Solange.

Sand's son Maurice disliked Chopin. Maurice wanted to establish himself as the "man of the estate" and did not wish to have Chopin as a rival. Maurice removed two sentences from a letter Sand wrote to Chopin when he published it because he felt that Sand was too affectionate toward Chopin and Solange.

Chopin and Sand separated two years before his death for a variety of reasons. Chopin was never asked back to Nohant; in 1848, he returned to Paris from a tour of the United Kingdom, to die at the Place Vendôme in 1849. George Sand was notably absent from his funeral.

In December 1849, Maurice invited the engraver Alexandre Manceau to celebrate Christmas in Nohant. George Sand fell passionately in love with Manceau, he became her lover, companion and secretary and they stayed together for fifteen years until his death.

=== Last years and death ===
George Sand had no choice but to write for the theater because of financial difficulties. In Nohant, she even exercised the functions of village doctor, having studied anatomy and herbal remedies with a Doctor Deschartres. But she was not confined to Nohant, and travelled in France, and in particular with her great friend Charles Robin-Duvernet at the Château du Petit Coudray, or abroad. In 1864, Sand took residence in Palaiseau together with her beloved Manceau for a couple of months, where she tended him in his decline.

Sand died at Nohant, near Châteauroux, in France's Indre département on 8 June 1876, at the age of 71. She was buried in the private graveyard behind the chapel at Nohant-Vic. In 2003, plans that her remains be moved to the Panthéon in Paris resulted in controversy.

== Career and politics ==
Sand's first literary efforts were collaborations with the writer Jules Sandeau. They published several stories together, signing them Jules Sand. Sand's first published novel Rose et Blanche (1831) was written in collaboration with Sandeau. She subsequently adopted, for her first independent novel, Indiana (1832), the pen name that made her famous – George Sand.

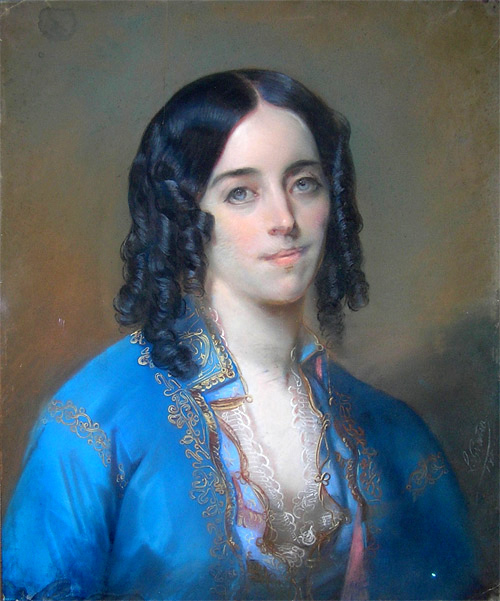
George Sand by Charles Louis Gratia (c. 1835)

By the age of 27, Sand was Europe's most popular writer of either gender, more popular than both Victor Hugo and Honoré de Balzac in England in the 1830s and 1840s, and she remained immensely popular as a writer throughout her lifetime and long after her death. Early in her career, her work was in high demand; by 1836, the first of several compendia of her writings was published in 24 volumes. In total, four separate editions of her "Complete Works" were published during her lifetime. In 1880, her children sold the rights to her literary estate for 125,000 Francs (equivalent to 36 kg of gold, or 1.3 million 2015 US dollars).

Drawing from her childhood experiences of the countryside, Sand wrote the pastoral novels La Mare au Diable (1846), François le Champi (1847–1848), La Petite Fadette (1849), and Les Beaux Messieurs de Bois-Doré (1857). A Winter in Majorca described the period that she and Chopin spent on that island from 1838 to 1839. Her other novels include Indiana (1832), Lélia (1833), Mauprat (1837), Le Compagnon du Tour de France (1840), Consuelo (1842–1843), and Le Meunier d'Angibault (1845).

Theatre pieces and autobiographical pieces include Histoire de ma vie (1855), Elle et Lui (1859, about her affair with Musset), Journal Intime (posthumously published in 1926), and Correspondence. Sand often performed her theatrical works in her small private theatre at the Nohant estate.

=== Political views ===
Sand also wrote literary criticism and political texts. In her early life, she sided with the poor and working class as well as championing women's rights. When the 1848 Revolution began, she was an ardent republican. Sand started her own newspaper, published in a workers' co-operative.

Politically, she became very active after 1841, and the leaders of the day often consulted with her and took her advice. She was a member of the provisional government of 1848, issuing a series of fiery manifestos. While many Republicans were imprisoned or went to exile after Louis-Napoléon Bonaparte's coup d'état of December 1851, she remained in France, maintained an ambiguous relationship with the new regime, and negotiated pardons and reduced sentences for her friends.

Sand was known for her implication and writings during the Paris Commune of 1871, where she took a position for the Versailles assembly against the communards, urging them to take violent action against the rebels. She was appalled by the violence of the Paris Commune, writing, "The horrible adventure continues. They ransom, they threaten, they arrest, they judge. They have taken over all the city halls, all the public establishments, they're pillaging the munitions and the food supplies."

== Criticism ==
George Sand was an idea. She has a unique place in our age.
Others are great men ... she was a great woman.

— Victor Hugo, Les funérailles de George Sand

Sand's writing was immensely popular during her lifetime and she was highly respected by the literary and cultural elite in France. Victor Hugo, in the eulogy he gave at her funeral, said "the lyre was within her."

In this country whose law is to complete the French Revolution and begin that of the equality of the sexes, being a part of the equality of men, a great woman was needed. It was necessary to prove that a woman could have all the manly gifts without losing any of her angelic qualities, be strong without ceasing to be tender ... George Sand proved it.

— Victor Hugo, Les funérailles de George Sand

Eugène Delacroix was a friend and respected her literary gifts. Flaubert was an unabashed admirer. Honoré de Balzac, who knew Sand, once said that if someone thought she wrote badly, it was because their own standards of criticism were inadequate. He also noted that her treatment of imagery in her works showed that her writing had an exceptional subtlety, having the ability to "virtually put the image in the word". Alfred de Vigny referred to her as "Sappho".

Not all of her contemporaries admired her or her writing, poet Charles Baudelaire was one contemporary critic of George Sand: "She is stupid, heavy and garrulous. Her ideas on morals have the same depth of judgment and delicacy of feeling as those of janitresses and kept women ... The fact that there are men who could become enamoured of this slut is indeed a proof of the abasement of the men of this generation."

== Influences on literature ==
Fyodor Dostoevsky "read widely in the numerous novels of George Sand" and translated her La dernière Aldini in 1844, only to learn that it had already been published in Russian. In his mature period, he expressed an ambiguous attitude towards her. For instance, in his novella Notes from Underground, the narrator refers to sentiments he expresses as, "I launch off at that point into European, inexplicably lofty subtleties à la George Sand".

The English poet Elizabeth Barrett Browning (1806–61) wrote two poems: "To George Sand: A Desire" (1853) and "To George Sand: A Recognition". The American poet Walt Whitman cited Sand's novel Consuelo as a personal favorite, and the sequel to this novel, La Comtesse de Rudolstadt, contains at least a couple of passages that appear to have had a very direct influence on him.

In addition to her influences on English and Russian literature, Sand's writing and political views informed numerous 19th century authors in Spain and Latin America, including Gertrudis Gómez de Avellaneda, the Cuban-born writer who also published and lived in Spain. Critics have noted structural and thematic similarities between George Sand's Indiana, published in 1832, and Gómez de Avellaneda's anti-slavery novel Sab, published in 1841.

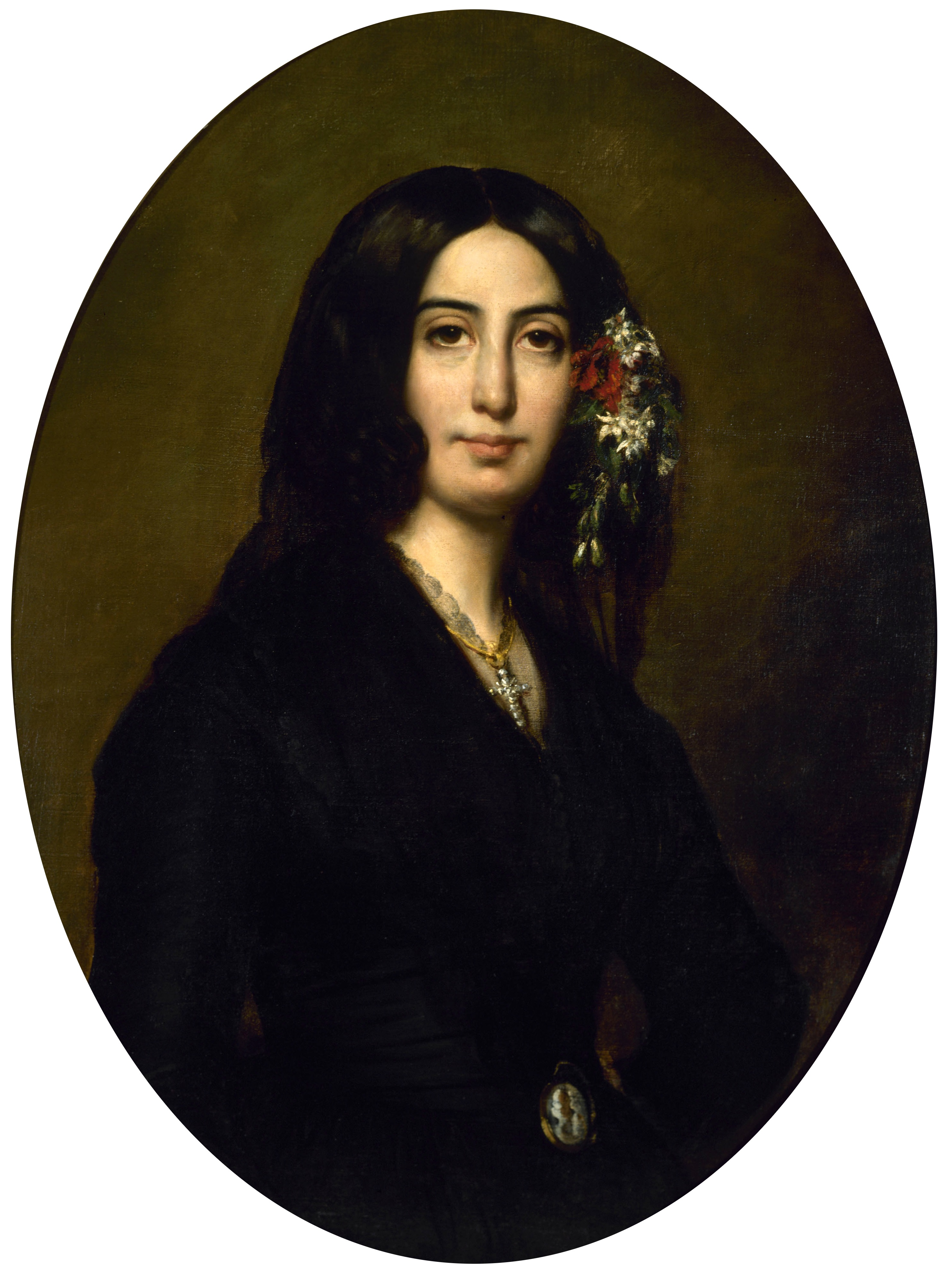
George Sand by Auguste Charpentier, 1838

In the first episode of the "Overture" to Swann's Way—the first novel in Marcel Proust's In Search of Lost Time sequence—a young, distraught Marcel is calmed by his mother as she reads from François le Champi, a novel which (it is explained) was part of a gift from his grandmother, which also included La Mare au Diable, La Petite Fadette, and Les Maîtres Sonneurs. As with many episodes involving art in À la recherche du temps perdu, this reminiscence includes commentary on the work. But by Time Regained, Proust writes that the "pen" of George Sand... no longer seemed to me, as for so long it had seemed to my mother before she had gradually come to model her literary tastes upon mine, in the least a magic pen.

Sand is also referred to in Virginia Woolf's book-length essay A Room of One's Own along with George Eliot and Charlotte Brontë as "all victims of inner strife as their writings prove, sought ineffectively to veil themselves by using the name of a man."

Frequent literary references to George Sand appear in Possession (1990) by A. S. Byatt and in the play Voyage, the first part of Tom Stoppard's The Coast of Utopia trilogy (2002). George Sand makes an appearance in Isabel Allende's Zorro, going still by her given name, as a young girl in love with Diego de la Vega (Zorro).

Chopin, Sand and her children are the main characters of the theater play by Polish writer Jarosław Iwaszkiewicz A Summer in Nohant, which premiered in 1930. The play, presenting the final stage of the writer-composer's relationship, was adapted five times by Polish Television: in 1963 (with Antonina Gordon-Górecka as Sand and Gustaw Holoubek as Chopin), in 1972 (with Halina Mikołajska and Leszek Herdegen), in 1980 (with Anna Polony and Michał Pawlicki), in 1999 (with Joanna Szczepkowska, who portrayed Solange in the 1980 version and Piotr Skiba) and in 2021 (with Katarzyna Herman and Marek Kossakowski).

Briefly, a Delicious Life, a 2022 novel by Nell Stevens, features Chopin and George Sand as protagonists, and is a fictional account of their 1838–39 holiday in Mallorca.

== Legacy ==
=== In film ===
George Sand is portrayed by Merle Oberon in A Song to Remember, by Patricia Morison in Song Without End, by Rosemary Harris in Notorious Woman, by Judy Davis in James Lapine's 1991 British-American film Impromptu; and by Juliette Binoche in the 1999 French film Children of the Century (Les Enfants du siècle). Also in George Who? (French: George qui?), a 1973 French biographical film directed by Michèle Rosier and starring Anne Wiazemsky as George Sand, Alain Libolt and Denis Gunsbourg. In the 2002 Polish film Chopin: Desire for Love directed by Jerzy Antczak, George Sand is portrayed by Danuta Stenka. In the French film Flashback directed by Caroline Vigneaux, George Sand is portrayed by Suzanne Clément. George Sand is also portrayed by Nine D'Urso in the 2025 TV series La rebelle: Les aventures de la jeune George Sand. The show portrays an intimate relationship between D'Urso and Barbara Pravi (who plays Marie Dorval).

=== Museums ===
Sand's home, now the House of George Sand in the Indre department, has been acquired by the French state and is a museum dedicated to her.

The Musée de la Vie romantique, in the 9th arrondissement of Paris, has many mementos of Sand.

== Works ==
=== Novels ===
- Rose et Blanche (1831, with Jules Sandeau)
- Indiana (1832)
- Valentine (1832)
- Lélia (1833)
- Andréa (1833)
- Mattéa (1833)
- Jacques (1833)
- Kouroglou / Épopée Persane (1833)
- Leone Leoni (1833)
- André (1834)
- La Marquise (1834)
- Simon (1835)
- Mauprat (1837)
- Les Maîtres mosaïstes (The Master Mosaic Workers) (1837)
- L'Orco (1838)
- L'Uscoque (The Uscoque, or The Corsair) (1838)
- Spiridion (1839)
- Pauline (1839)
- Horace (1840)
- Le Compagnon du tour de France (The Journeyman Joiner, or the Companion of the Tour of France) (1840)
- Consuelo (1842)
- La Comtesse de Rudolstadt (Countess of Rudolstadt) (1843, a sequel to Consuelo)
- Jeanne (1844)
- Teverino (1845) (translated as Jealousy: Teverino)
- Le Péché de M. Antoine (The Sin of M. Antoine) (1845)
- Le Meunier d'Angibault (The Miller of Angibault) (1845)
- La Mare au Diable (The Devil's Pool) (1846)
- Lucrezia Floriani (1846)
- François le Champi (The Country Waif) (1847)
- La Petite Fadette (1849)
- Château des Désertes (1850)
- Histoire du véritable Gribouille (1851, translated as The Mysterious Tale of Gentle Jack and Lord Bumblebee)
- Les Maîtres sonneurs (The Bagpipers) (1853)
- Isidora (1853)
- La Daniella (1857)
- Les Beaux Messiers de Bois-Dore (The Gallant Lords of Bois-Dore or The Fine Gentlemen of Bois-Dore) (1857)
- Elle et Lui (She and He) (1859)
- Narcisse (1859)
- Jean de la Roche (1859)
- L'Homme de neige (The Snow Man) (1859)
- La Ville noire (The Black City) (1860)
- Marquis de Villemer (1860)
- Valvedre (1861)
- Antonia (1863)
- Mademoiselle La Quintinie (1863)
- Laura, Voyage dans le cristal (Laura, or Voyage into the Crystal) (1864)
- Monsieur Sylvestre (1866)
- Le Dernier Amour (1866, dedicated to Flaubert)
- Mademoiselle Merquem (1868)
- Pierre Qui Roule (A Rolling Stone) (1870)
- Le Beau Laurence (Handsome Lawrence) (1870, a sequel to Pierre Qui Roule)
- Malgretout (1870)
- Cesarine Dietrich (1871)
- Nanon (1872)
- Ma Sœur Jeanne (My Sister Jeannie) (1874)
- Flamarande (1875)
- Les Deux Frères (1875, a sequel to Flamarande)
- Marianne (1876)
- La Tour de Percemont (The Tower of Percemont) (1876)

=== Plays ===
- Gabriel (1839)
- Cosima ou La haine dans l'amour (1840)
- Les Sept cordes de la lyre (translated as A Woman's Version of the Faust Legend: The Seven Strings of the Lyre) (1840)
- François le Champi (1849)
- Claudie (1851)
- Le Mariage de Victorine (1851)
- Le Pressoir (1853)
- French adaptation of As You Like It (1856)
- Le Pavé (1862, "The Paving Stone")
- Le Marquis de Villemer (1864)
- Le Lis du Japon (1866, "The Japanese Lily")
- L'Autre (1870, with Sarah Bernhardt)
- Un Bienfait n'est jamais perdu (1872, "A Good Deed Is Never Wasted")

=== Autobiography ===
- Voyage en Auvergne (autobiographical sketch, 1827)
- Un hiver à Majorque (1842)
- Histoire de ma vie (Story of My Life) (autobiography up to the revolution of 1848; 1855)

Source: "George Sand (1804–1876) – Auteur du texte". data.bnf.fr. Bibliothèque nationale de France.

== See also ==
- Elizabeth Ann Ashurst (translator)
- Pauline Viardot
