= Trilby (disambiguation) =

A trilby is a narrow-brimmed hat with an indented crown.

Trilby may also refer to:

== Arts and entertainment ==
- Trilby (novel), an 1894 novel by George du Maurier
  - Trilby (play), an 1895 play based on du Maurier's novel
  - Trilby (1912 film), a silent film based on du Maurier's novel
  - Trilby (1914 film), a silent film based on the play
  - Trilby (1915 film), a silent film based on the novel
  - Trilby (1923 film), a silent film based on the novel
- Trilby, the main character in the Chzo Mythos series of computer adventure games
- Trilby, or the Fairy of Argyll, (French: Trilby, ou le lutin d'Argail), an 1822 novella by Charles Nodier
  - Trilby (ballet), an 1870 ballet based on Nodier's novel

== People ==
- Trilby Clark (1896–1983), Australian actress
- Trilby Glover, Australian actress
- William Norman Ewer (1885–1977), British journalist nicknamed "Trilby"
- Hubert Freakes (1914–1942), South African-born English rugby union international nicknamed "Trilby"
- T. Trilby, pseudonym of French novelist Thérèse de Marnyhac (1875–1962)

== Places in the United States ==
- Trilby, Florida, a census-designated place
- Trilby, West Virginia, an unincorporated community

== Other uses ==
- Trilby Tour, a British amateur golf tournament
- USS Trilby (SP-673), a United States Navy patrol boat in commission during 1917

== See also ==
- Trilby Yates, a New Zealand fashion label that operated from the 1920s to 1950s
