= Notorious Woman =

- Genre: Drama
- Written by: Harry W. Junkin
- Directed by: Waris Hussein
- Starring: Rosemary Harris; George Chakiris; Jeremy Irons
- Theme music composer: Anthony Isaac
- Country of origin: United Kingdom
- Original language: English
- No. of seasons: 1
- No. of episodes: 7

Production
- Producer: Pieter Rogers

Original release
- Network: BBC2
- Release: 3 November 1974 – 1974

Notorious Woman is a 1974 BBC television serial based on the life of the French author George Sand. It starred Rosemary Harris in the title role. The seven episodes were written by Harry W. Junkin and directed by Waris Hussein.

In the United States, the series was broadcast in 1975–1976 as part of the fifth season of Masterpiece Theatre on PBS.

For reasons never volunteered by the BBC, the series was shelved, never re-released nor given an explanation as to why.

== Principal cast ==
- Rosemary Harris – George Sand
- Lewis Fiander – Casimir Dudevant
- George Chakiris – Frédéric Chopin
- Alan Howard – Prosper Mérimée
- Jeremy Irons – Franz Liszt
- Peter Woodthorpe – Honoré de Balzac
- Shane Briant – Alfred de Musset
- Sinéad Cusack – Marie Dorval
- Leon Vitali – Jules Sandeau
- Jonathan Newth – Hippolyte Chatiron
- Joyce Redman – Sophie Dupin
- Cathleen Nesbitt – Madame Dupin
- Georgina Hale – Solange Dudevant

== Awards and nominations ==
- 1976 Emmy Award: Outstanding Lead Actress in a Limited Series, Rosemary Harris
- 1976 Golden Globe Nomination: Best TV Actress in a Drama, Rosemary Harris
