= House of George Sand =

Writer's house museum in Nohant, Indre department, France

Coordinates: 46°37′30″N 1°58′32″E

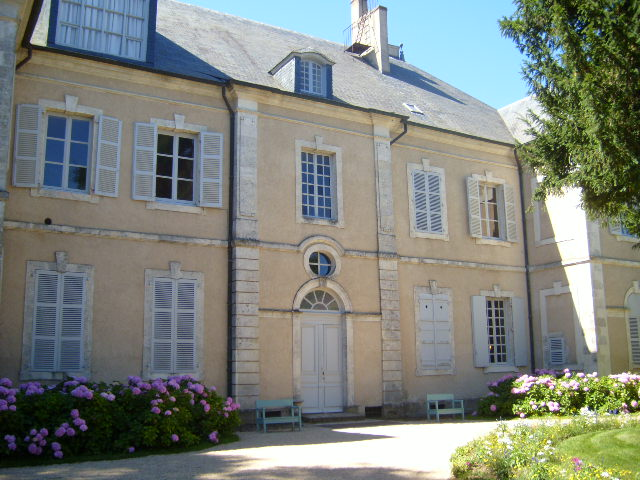
The house of George Sand

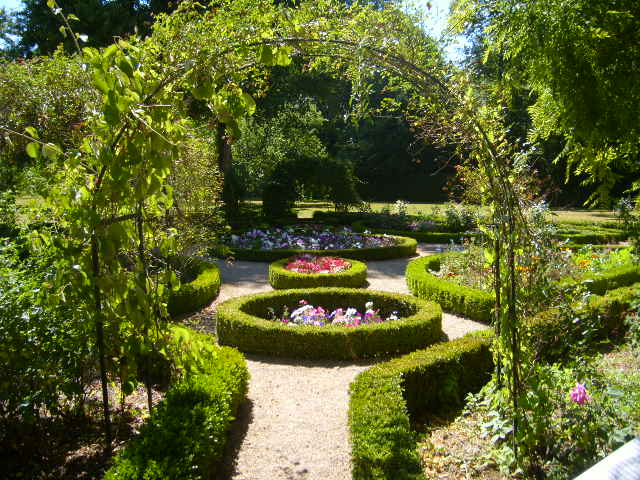
The garden of George Sand

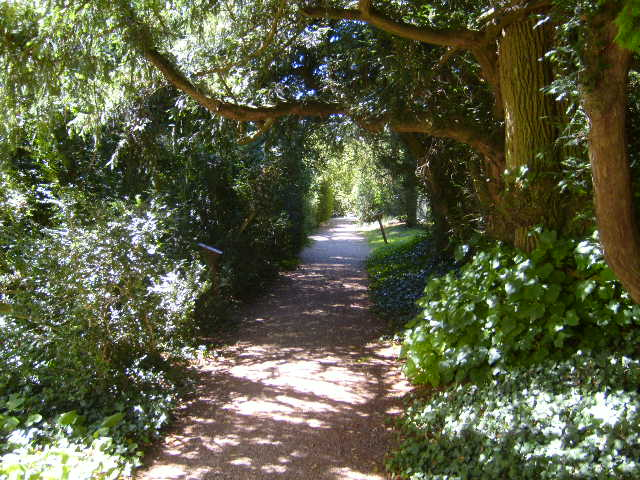
The English-style park of George Sand

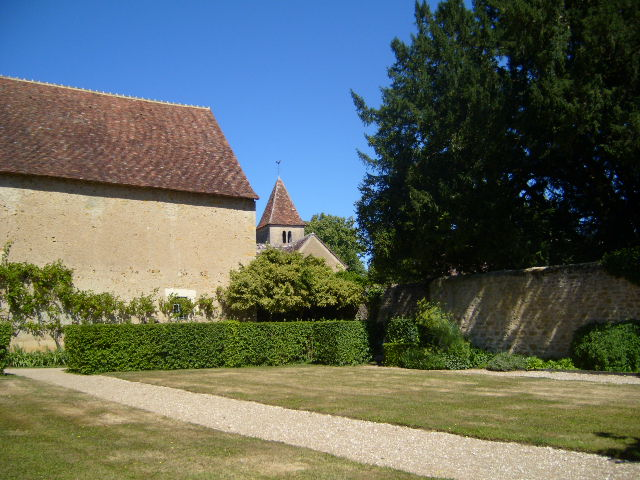
The barn and garden of George Sand, and the church of Nohant. Sand's grave is in a small enclosed cemetery between the church and the garden.

The House of George Sand is a writer's house museum in the village of Nohant, in the Indre department of France. It was the home of George Sand (born as Aurore Dupin; 1804–1876), a French author, and was purchased by the French state in 1952. The house was preserved because it was where Sand wrote many of her books and hosted some of the most important artists and writers of her time, including Frédéric Chopin, Franz Liszt, Honoré de Balzac, Ivan Turgenev, and Eugène Delacroix.

The writer and her family are buried in a small cemetery between the garden and the village church. The gardens are classified by the French Ministry of Culture as among the Notable Gardens of France. The house is open to the public and is managed by the Centre des monuments nationaux.

== Description ==
The house is located in the small French village of Nohant, right in the heart of the Berry region of central France. It features a large garden and a small park, with many features and aspects that Sand designed herself. One can still see the sound boards Sand installed to keep out the sound of the piano when she lived there with Frédéric Chopin, and the two cedar trees that she planted to commemorate the birth of her two children, Solange and Maurice. There are also a few rooms within the house that Sand designed, including the "blue room", where she died.

== History ==
The village of 'Nohan' was mentioned in French chronicles as early as 1228. A fortified manor house stood on the site and was reconstructed between 1450 and 1452. Two of the original towers are part of the farm of the present chateau.

In 1767, the land and house were purchased by Pierre Pearron, who reconstructed the manor in its present form. It was sold in 1793, during the French Revolution, to Madame Dupin de Francueil, the illegitimate daughter of the French military hero Maurice de Saxe. She was the granddaughter of the King of Poland, August II the Strong, and grandmother of George Sand, who laid out the gardens and built the main stairway.

In 1808, Aurore Dupin (the future George Sand), then just four years old, came to live with her grandmother after the accidental death of her father, Maurice Dupin, an officer in the French army. Aurore's grandmother was not happy with what she considered the excessive exuberance and free ways of the child, and she subsequently sent Aurore to a convent.

When Aurore was 16, her grandmother was paralyzed by a stroke, and Aurore returned to Nohant to take care of her. When her grandmother died in 1821, Aurore received the house as an inheritance. The following year, she married Casimir Dudevant, who was nine years her senior. They had two children, Maurice (1823–1889) and Solange (1828–1899). To mark the births of the children, Aurore planted two cedar trees in front of the house, which are still there.

In 1830, Aurore fell in love with Jules Sandeau, and she left her husband to move to Paris. There she wrote two novels, Indiana and Lélia, under the name "George Sand", which made her famous. In her absence, her husband took possession of the house. She regained it after a lawsuit and moved back into the house in 1837.

From 1837 until her death in 1876, she spent long summers at the house, usually from May until November, where she entertained many of the most famous artists of the time, including composer Franz Liszt, writers Honoré de Balzac and Gustave Flaubert, and painter Eugène Delacroix. From 1839 until 1847, Frédéric Chopin lived with her in the house, completing his second piano sonata, and writing the Fantaisie in F minor, the two Nocturnes, Op. 37, and the four Mazurkas, Op. 41. The panels Sand installed to muffle the sound of Chopin's piano can still be seen.

Many of her most famous novels, including Consuelo, La Mare au Diable, and Le Meunier d'Angibault, were written in the house, and most of her novels are set in the Berry countryside and villages around Nohant.

== Present Condition ==
After her death in 1876, the home passed to her son, Maurice. The house remained in the family until the death of Maurice's eldest daughter, Aurore (1866–1961). It was then bought by the French Government. In 1952, it was classified as a National Historical Monument of France, and it was opened to the public in 1961 as the Maison de George Sand à Nohant. Today, it is a museum dedicated to the author, her work, and her legacy.

The site is also of interest for its links to Chopin and there is a display about Nohant at the Chopin museum in Warsaw.

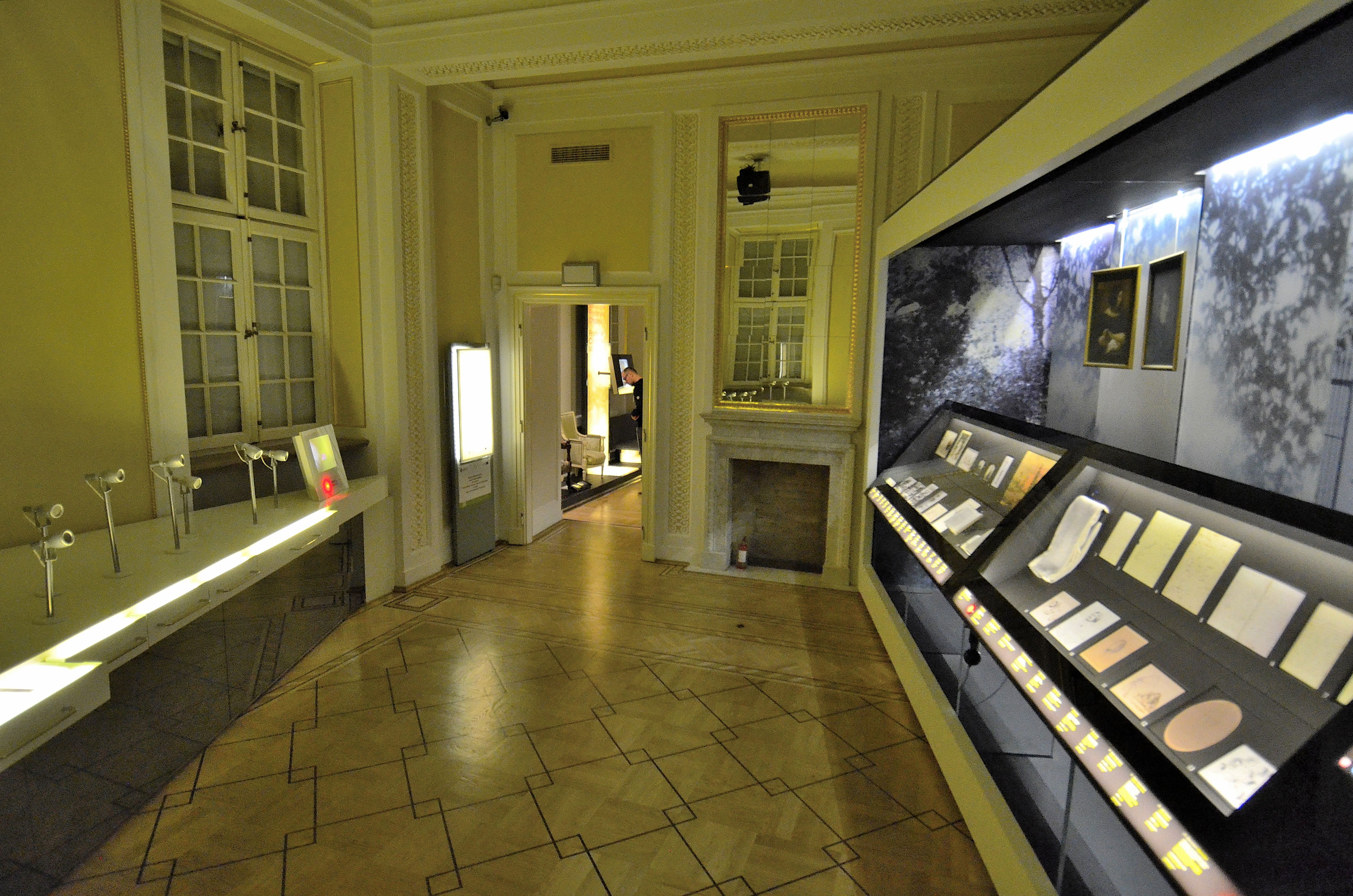
Display about Nohant
