= Lewis Fiander =

Australian actor (1938–2016)

- Born: Lewis Ernest Fiander; 12 January 1938; Melbourne, Victoria, Australia
- Died: 24 May 2016 (aged 78); Melbourne, Victoria, Australia
- Occupation: Actor

Lewis Ernest Fiander (12 January 1938 – 24 May 2016) was an Australian film, stage, and television actor.

== Early life ==
Fiander was born in Melbourne to Mona Jane (née King) and Walter Lewis Fiander, and educated at Trinity Grammar School, Kew.

He began his stage career as a schoolboy with the Australian National Theatre Movement in Melbourne.

== Career ==
Fiander became a successful radio actor in Sydney and appeared in the first Australian television play, The Sub-Editor’s Room for ABC TV.

Moving to the UK from his native Australia, initially to appear in the play The One Day of the Year, Fiander appeared in such films as I Start Counting (1970), Dr. Jekyll and Sister Hyde (1971), Dr. Phibes Rises Again (1972), The Abdication (1974), Who Can Kill a Child? (1976), Not Now, Comrade (1976), Sweeney 2 (1978), The Doctor and the Devils (1985), Georgia (1988) and Paperback Romance (1994). His first major role on television was Mr. Darcy in the BBC's first colour adaptation of Pride and Prejudice (1967).

In 1970, Fiander originated the role of John Adams in the London stage production of 1776, a role he reprised in Australia. Other stage appearances in West End musicals included the roles of Lord Melbourne and Disraeli in I and Albert, Noël Coward in Noel and Gertie and Puccini in Cafe Puccini.

During the 1970s, he was cast as Professor Tryst in the Doctor Who episode "Nightmare of Eden" and after discussion with his friend Tom Baker chose to give the character a hybrid accent as would befit an alien in the future. In 1974, he appeared as Casimir Dudevant playing opposite Rosemary Harris in the BBC series Notorious Woman and performed the role of Thomas Becket on a cast-album of the musical Thomas and The King.

On radio, he played the eponymous lead role in the comedy series Patterson.

He returned to Australia in the early 1980s and continued his acting career.

In 2004 he contributed the voice for airship engineer Kemp in Anthony Lucas's Oscar nominated animation, The Mysterious Geographic Explorations of Jasper Morello.

Lewis Fiander's last known film appearance was in the Don Percy short film Two Moments in Time. Fiander's scenes were shot in late September 2015. The film was completed in 2017, and premiered at the St Kilda Film Festival in 2018.

== Death ==
Fiander died on 24 May 2016, following a stroke.

== Filmography ==
=== Film ===
Year	Title	Role	Notes
1962	The Password Is Courage	Pringle	Feature film
1963	The V.I.P.s	Third Reporter (uncredited)	Feature film
1970	I Start Counting	Priest at Church	Feature film
1971	Dr. Jekyll and Sister Hyde	Howard Spencer	Feature film
1972	Dr. Phibes Rises Again	Baker	Feature film
1974	The Abdication	Father Dominic	Feature film
1976	Who Can Kill a Child?	Tom	Feature film
1976	Not Now, Comrade	Rudi Petrovyan	Feature film
1978	Sweeney 2	Gorran	Feature film
1985	The Doctor and the Devils	Dr. Thornton	Feature film
1986	On Wings of Fire	Tansar	Feature film
1988	Georgia	Scarlatti	Feature film
1994	Paperback Romance (aka Lucky Break)	Mr. Bruce Wrightman	Feature film
2004	The Mysterious Geographic Explorations of Jasper Morello	Kemp (voice)	Animated film
2015	Two Moments in Time		Short film (last appearance)

=== Television ===
Year	Title	Role	Notes
1967	Pride and Prejudice	Mr Darcy	TV series
1974	Notorious Woman	Casimir Dudevant	TV miniseries
1975	Angels	Mr Collins	TV series, Episode 6, Season 1
1976	Victorian Scandals	Daniel Dunglass Home	TV series, episode: "The Frontiers of Science"
1979	Doctor Who	Professor Tryst	TV series, episode: "Nightmare of Eden"
1980-81	Lady Killers	Richard Muir, Said Enani	TV series, 4 episodes
1982	Young Sherlock: The Mystery of the Manor House	Ranjeet	TV series, 7 episodes
1989	Tanamera – Lion of Singapore	Papa Jack	TV miniseries

== Radio ==
Year	Title	Role	Notes
1981	Patterson	Patterson	BBC Radio 3

== Theatre ==
Year	Title	Role	Notes
1953	Accolade	Tom	National Theatre, Melbourne
1953; 1955	The Merchant of Venice	Launcelot Gobbo	National Theatre, Melbourne
1953	The New Adventures of Ginger Meggs	Bang Bang the Clown	National Theatre, Melbourne
1955	The Poltergeist		National Theatre, Melbourne
1955	Twelfth Night	Feste	National Theatre, Melbourne
1955	Shakespeare Festival 1955		National Theatre, Melbourne
1955	Hamlet	Player Queen / Horatio	National Theatre, Melbourne
1955	The Lady from the Sea		National Theatre, Melbourne
1955	Vulture's Eye		National Theatre, Melbourne
1959	Moby Dick—Rehearsed	Ishmael	Elizabethan Theatre, Sydney, University of Melbourne
1959	The Waltz of the Toreadors	Gaston	University of Melbourne
1959	Arms and the Man	Major Plechanoff	University of Melbourne
1959	The Party	Soya Marshall	University of Melbourne
1959	Venus Observed	Edgar	University of Melbourne
1959	The Rape of the Belt	Zeus	University of Melbourne
1959	The Ghost Train	Richard Winthrop	University of Melbourne
1959; 1960	Sweeney Todd	Dr Aminadab Lupin	University of Melbourne,
1960	Prisoners' Country	Cunningham	University of Melbourne
1960	The Entertainer	Frank Rice	University of Melbourne
1960	Ah, Wilderness!		Elizabethan Theatre, Sydney
1961	The Mystery of a Hansom Cab	Brian Fitzgerald	University of Melbourne, Russell Street Theatre, Melbourne
1961	A Taste of Honey	Geoff	Palace Theatre, Sydney with Elizabethan Theatre Trust, Sydney
1961	The Glass Menagerie		Palace Theatre, Sydney
1961	The Merchant of Venice	Launcelot Gobbo / Shylock	Palace Theatre, Sydney with Elizabethan Theatre Trust, Sydney
	The Hostage	Leslie	Elizabethan Theatre Trust, Sydney
1961	The One Day of the Year	Hughie Cook	Theatre Royal Stratford East with Elizabethan Theatre, Sydney
1962	The School for Scandal	1st Gentleman	Theatre Royal, London Haymarket Theatre, London with Tennent Productions
1963	Virtue in Danger	Lory	Strand Theatre, London & Mermaid Theatre, London with Mermaid Theatre Company
1963 (64?)	The Royal Hunt of the Sun	Domingo	The Old Vic Theatre, London with British National Theatre Company
1963–64	Saint Joan	Canon de Courcelles	The Old Vic Theatre, London & Chichester Festival Theatre with British National Theatre Company
1963–64	Hamlet	Court Ladies, Courtiers, Soldiers, Servants	The Old Vic Theatre, London with British National Theatre Company (understudied Peter O’Toole for lead role of Hamlet)
1964	Andorra	Extra	The Old Vic Theatre, London
1964	Philoctetes	Chorus	The Old Vic Theatre, London with British National Theatre Company
1966	Stephen D.	Stephen	Citizens Theatre, Glasgow
1966	The Comedy of Errors	Antipholus of Syracuse	New Zealand tour with Royal Shakespeare Company
1967	The Pursuit of Love	Christian Talbot	The Old Vic Theatre, London with Theatre Royal
1967	She Stoops to Conquer		Oxford Playhouse
1968	The Silent Woman	Truwit	Oxford Playhouse
1968	The Duel	Deacon Pobyedov	Duke of York's Theatre, London
1969	Saint Joan	Warwick	Oxford Playhouse
1969	The Bootleg Gentleman		Yvonne Arnaud Theatre, Guildford
1969	A Talent to Amuse		Phoenix Theatre, London
1970	Peer Gynt	Peer Gynt	Nuffield Theatre, Southampton & Oxford Playhouse
1970–71	1776	John Adams	New Theatre, London, Her Majesty's Theatre, Melbourne, Theatre Royal, Sydney
1972	Volpone	Mosca	Bristol Old Vic with Theatre Royal
1972–73	I and Albert	Benjamin Disraeli / Lord Melbourne	Piccadilly Theatre, London
1974; 1975	Follow the Star	Herod	Chichester Festival Theatre & Westminster, UK
1975	Thomas and The King	Thomas Becket	Her Majesty’’ Theatre, London
1976	Same Time Next Year	George	Comedy Theatre, Melbourne, Theatre Royal, Sydney, Her Majesty's Theatre, Brisbane, Her Majesty's Theatre, Adelaide
1977–78	Wild Oats	Jack Rover	Aldwych Theatre, London & Piccadilly Theatre, London with Royal Shakespeare Company
1978	Arms and the Man	Bluntschli	Greenwich Theatre, London
1979	Clouds	Owen Shorter	Criterion Theatre, London
1980	Old Heads and Young Hearts	Littleton Coke	Chichester Festival Theatre
1981	The Killing Game	Lt. Colonel Guy Holden	Apollo Theatre, London
1985	Cavalcade	Robert Marryot	Chichester Festival Theatre
1986	Cafe Puccini	Puccini	Wyndham’s Theatre, London
1986	Noël and Gertie	Noël Coward	Donmar Warehouse Theatre, London
1986–87	Aren’t We All?	Willie Tatham	His Majesty's Theatre, Perth, Comedy Theatre, Melbourne, Her Majesty's Theatre, Sydney with Remarkable Enterprises
1988	My Fair Lady	Henry Higgins	State Theatre, Melbourne, Festival Theatre, Adelaide with Victorian Stare Opera
1988	The Browning Version and Harlequinade	Jack Wakefield / Frank Hunter	Her Majesty's Theatre, Sydney, Comedy Theatre, Melbourne, Canberra Theatre, His Majesty's Theatre, Perth
1980s	Perchance to Dream	Ivor Novello	Northcott Theatre, Exeter
1990	Rumors	Lenny Ganz	Australian tour
1990	Love Letters	Andrew Makepeace Ladd III	Playhouse, Melbourne
1991	The Woman in Black	The Actor	Sydney Opera House, Manning Entertainment Centre, Laycock Street Theatre, Illawarra Performing Arts Centre, Suncorp Theatre, Brisbane
1991	The Phantom of the Opera		Princess Theatre Melbourne with The Really Useful Theatre Company
1992	Dear Liar		Geelong Arts Centre, Monash University
1993	Follies		State Theatre, Melbourne
1994	A Flea in Her Ear	Carlos Homenides / Histangua	Playhouse, Melbourne with Melbourne Theatre Company for Melbourne International Comedy Festival
	A Portrait of the Artist as a Young Man	Solo recital	
	Enoch Arden	Solo recital	
	Townhall Cavalcade	Solo recital	Mietta's, Melbourne
	The Long Farewell	Solo recital	Mietta's, Melbourne
1994	There's One In Every Marriage		Mietta's, Melbourne
1994	Kismet in Concert	The Wazir of Police	Arts Centre, Melbourne
1995–96	Arcadia	Bernard	Playhouse, Melbourne, Suncorp Piazza, Brisbane
1995	Ruddigore	Sir Despard Murgatroyd	State Theatre, Melbourne
1996	Private Lives	Elyot Chase	Fairfax Studio, Melbourne with Melbourne Theatre Company
1997	Sweet Charity		Her Majesty's Theatre, Melbourne
1999	A Return to the Brink	Colonel Campbell	Malthouse, Theatre, Melbourne
2000; 2001	Australian Philharmonic Orchestra	Compère	Sydney Opera House
2000	The Best of British	MC	Melbourne Concert Hall
2000	New Years Eve Extravaganza		Melbourne Concert Hall
2001	God Only Knows		Marian Street Theatre
2001	An Evening In Paris		Melbourne Concert Hall, Sydney Opera House
2002	Pop Goes Gilbert & Sullivan	Narrator	Melbourne Concert Hall
2002	The Night They Invented Champagne		Sydney Opera House, Costa Hall, Geelong, Melbourne Concert Hall, Festival Theatre, Adelaide
2002	Vienna Waits for You	MC	Melbourne Concert Hall, Adelaide Convention Centre
2002	Keene / Taylor Theatre Project (Two Shanks)		Fortyfivedownstairs, Melbourne
2003	The Visit	The Burgomeister	Playhouse, Melbourne with Melbourne Theatre Company
2003	Hats Off!		National Theatre, Melbourne
2004	Afterplay		Fortyfivedownstairs, Melbourne
2004	I'm In Love With Vienna		Sydney Opera House
2004	Morning Melodies: The Piccadilly Music Hall		Nambour Civic Centre
2006	Silver Jubilee Concert		Hamer Hall, Melbourne
2006	Not New Year's Eve		Sydney Opera House
2007	Musically Speaking		Fortyfivedownstairs, Melbourne
2007	He's Never Done This Before		Phee Broadway Theatre, Melbourne
2007	Enlightenment	Gordon	Fairfax Studio, Melbourne
2008–09	Travelling North	Saul Morgenstein	Randall Theatre, Melbourne, Playhouse, Brisbane with Queensland Theatre Company, Star Court Theatre, Lismore, Z-Pac Theatre, Hervey Bay, Tuggeranong Arts Centre, Westside Performing Arts Centre, Mooroopna, Riverside Theatres Parramatta, Mildura Arts Centre
2011	Be Watched by Gary Files (preliminary readings 1)	Denzil	Majestic Cinemas, Sydney
