= Louise Crombach =

English fashion designer (1815–1894)

- Born: 24 December 1815; Lons-le-Saunier
- Died: 12 April 1894 (aged 78); Paris
- Occupations: Seamstress; writer; prison inspector
- Known for: being prosecuted for lesbianism, early feminist literature
- Movement: Saint-Simonianism; Fourierism
- Children: Jeanne Théodore Julie Crombach; Berthe Virginie Ernestine Belon

Louise Crombach or Crombak (24 December 1815 – 12 April 1894) was a French seamstress, prison inspector, writer and feminist. In 1845, she was prosecuted for having a lesbian relationship.

== Early life and education ==
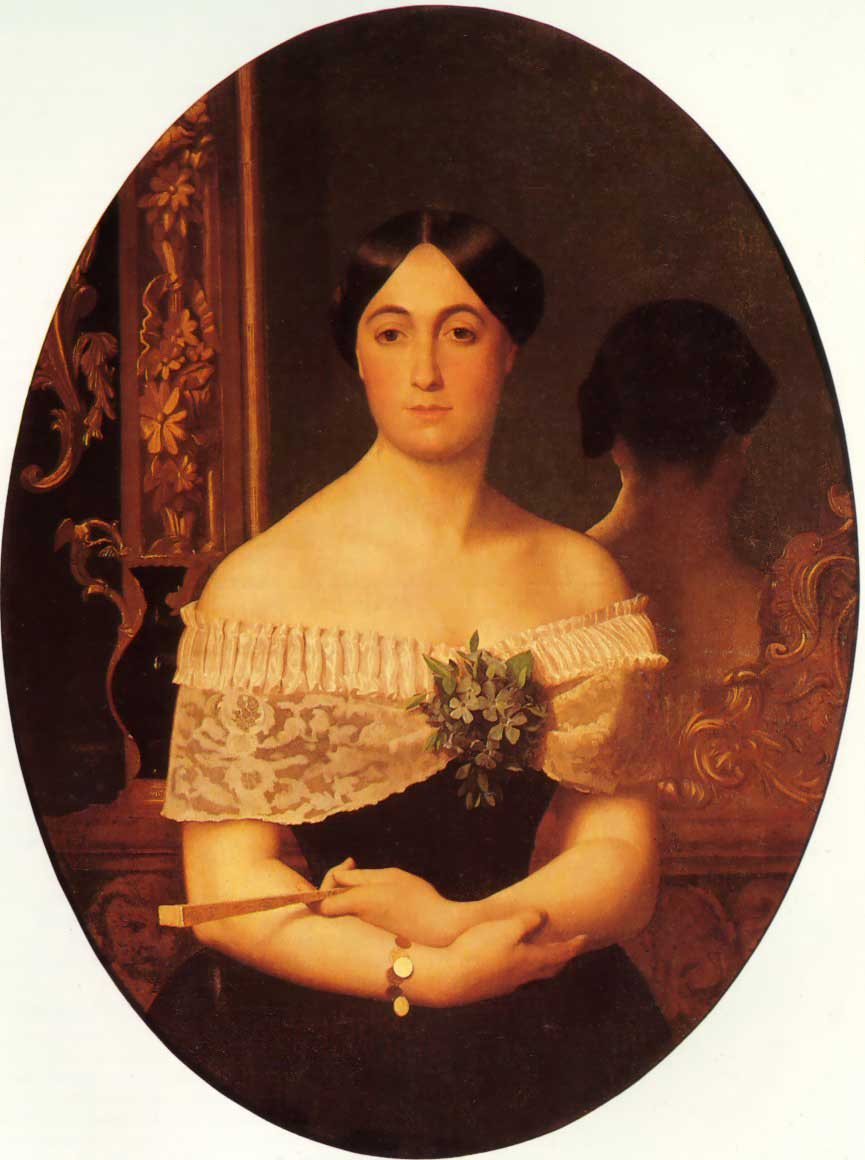
Elisa de Lamartine

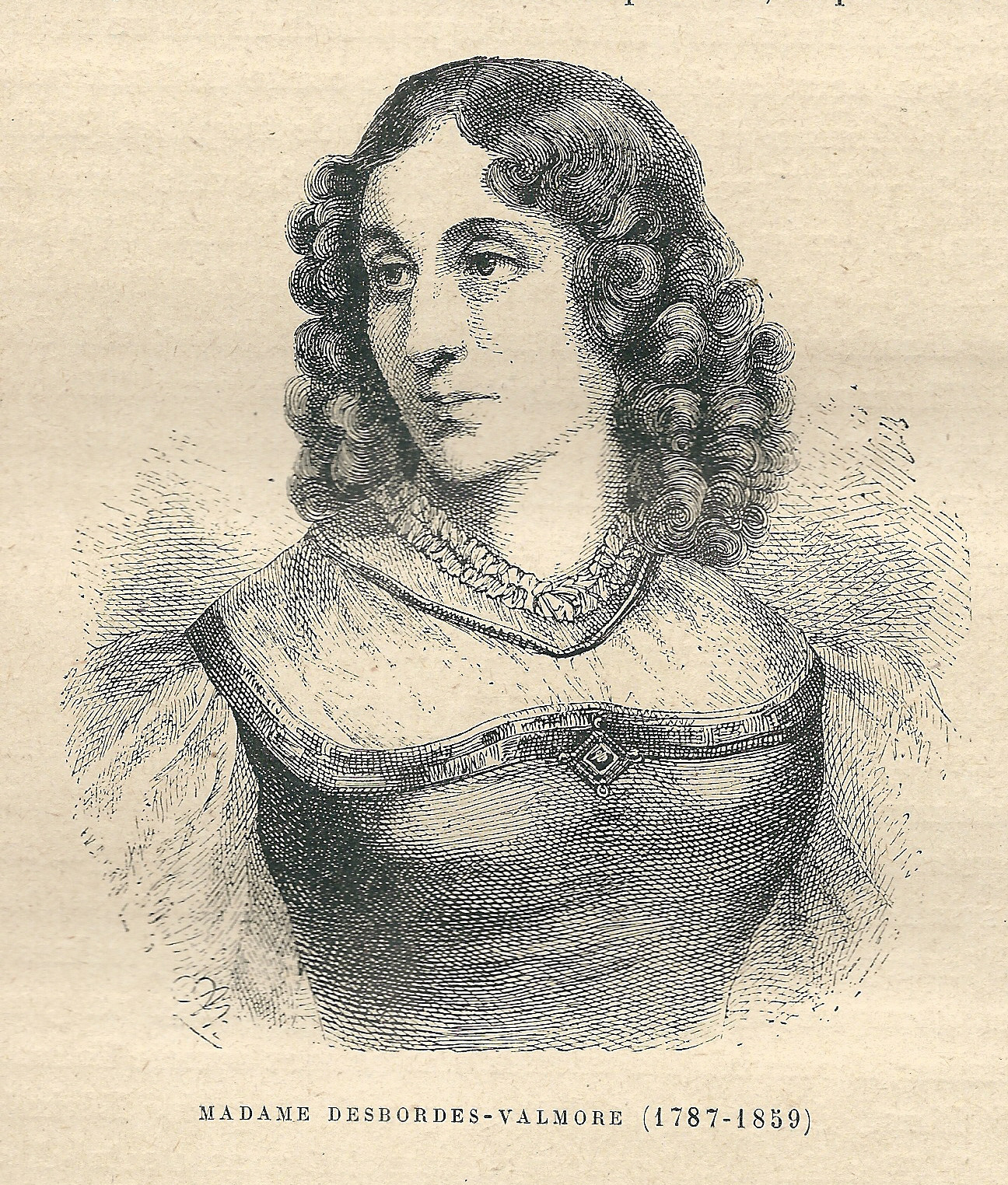
Marceline Desbordes-Valmore

Louise Crombach was the daughter of a peasant woman from Franche-Comté and an Alsatian Jew and she received a modest education. She began her professional life as a seamstress but, in view of her literary talent, which was compared to that of Elisa Mercœur, she was sent to Paris, where she was welcomed by Amable Tastu. She was introduced to the prestigious literary salon, Le Cénacle, held by Charles Nodier and was the protégé of the Lamartines. She became the tutor of George Sand's daughter, Solange Dudevant.

== Career ==
Louise Crombach frequented literary circles where she met Marceline Desbordes-Valmore, also from a working-class family. She was one of the first writers from a working-class background to make a living from her art, continuing the trend started by George Sand.

Her first children's book, Le Jeune libéré, was published in 1839 and received the Montyon Prize from the French Academy the following year. In 1839, she gave birth to a child (Jeanne Théodore Julie Crombach) that was not recognized by her father and causing her to lose part of her protections because of the social scandal.

Faced with material difficulties, Elisa de Lamartine found her a job as a Prison Guard at the women's prison Saint-Lazare in 1842. Louise Crombach became an inspector there in 1844. It was there that she was moved by the detention conditions of the women prisoners and their misery to which she felt close.

In 1843, Flora Tristan, in spite of Louise Crombach's difficult financial situation, solicited her for a subscription that she organized for the newspaper L'Union ouvrière. That year, one of Desbordes-Valmore's poems ("Moi, je le sais", in Bouquets et prières) was dedicated to her. Louise Crombach introduced her to Marie Pape-Carpantier, as they knew each other. At the beginning of 1844, she joined the team of journalists of Le Nouveau Monde, Journal de la science sociale, which aimed to revive, without success, the former Fourierist journal Le Nouveau Monde. Other editors included Arthur de Bonnard, one of the first French cooperators, and Auguste Colin.

Accused of having let a captive escape on February 6, 1845, a trial followed on May 30, 1845, during which letters insinuating that Crombach had a lesbian relationship with a prisoner were read. Desbordes-Valmore intervened in the trial, exclaiming:

J'ai vu une fois de près un tribunal d'hommes. Ce n'est pas ainsi que je comprends la lumière et la justice. (in English : I once saw a men's court up close. This is not how I understand light and justice."

— Francis Ambrière, Le grief des femmes II, p119

Louise Crombach was sentenced to two years in prison in June, but an appeal to the Court of Cassation overturned the judgment. She was released on November 28, 1845. The revelation of this correspondence, however, distanced her from Desbordes-Valmore, so much so that she did not intervene when Crombach was again the subject of a trial in November 1845 in Versailles. Crombach was nevertheless acquitted and went to take refuge in La Villette with a priest. Her second daughter was born on the 10th of August 1848 in Paris and was recognized by her father Marie Alexandre Alexis Belon, to whom Louise Crombach, however, was not married. Louise Crombach lived with her daughter Berthe and later Berthe's family until Louise died in 1894.

== Works ==
- Le Jeune libéré (1839)
- Hélène et Laurence (1841)
- Un pauvre devant Dieu, ou Qu'est-ce que la richesse ? (1845)
- Les Papillons et les enfants, Alexandre et Michel, les Roses de la Fête-Dieu, le Médaillon-protecteur (1845)

== Theatre ==
- Une Distribution des Prix, in: Musée de Familles, Lecture du Soir, Tome Onzième, Paris (1843-44)

== Articles ==
- Maison d'Asile pour les femmes sans travail, in: Le Nouveau monde : théorie de Charles Fourier, (1839-44)

== Reception ==
In 2025, the German-Swiss writer Ulrike Ulrich published her novel Zeit ihres Lebens, in which she reconstructs the life of Louise Crombach using newspaper articles and archive records, and pays tribute to the author's work, in particular Crombach's final and longest novel, Hélene et Laurence.
