= Jean Sbogar =

1818 novel

- 1832 edition
- Author: Charles Nodier
- Language: French
- Genre: Gothic romance
- Publisher: Gide
- Publication date: 1818
- Publication place: France
- Media type: Print

Jean Sbogar is an 1818 gothic romance novel by the French writer Charles Nodier. Set in the Balkans, it features an ultimately love affair between a brigand based in the Illyrian Alps and a aristocratic woman from Venice. During the Napoleonic era Nodier had lived in the Illyrian Provinces, and drew on his experiences there for the story. Stylistically it reflects the Romanticism of the period, While the story was poorly received initially, it experienced a dramatic increase in popularity when it was publicised that the exiled Emperor of France Napoleon had read and enjoyed it on the island Saint Helena where he was imprisoned by the British.

It was first handled by the publisher Théophile-Étienne Gide, but its commercial success led to other editions being released. The work was influenced by British authors, with one critic noting that the style imitated Lord Byron while his subsequent novella Trilby owed more to Walter Scott. It has been described as "sub-Radcliffe". It was adapted into a stage play of the same title by Jean-Guillaume-Antoine Cuvelier.

== Bibliography ==
- Partridge, Eric. The French Romantics' Knowledge of English Literature. Slatkine Reprints, 1974.
- Pitwood, Michael. Dante and the French Romantics. Droz, 1985.
- Smith, Andrew, Punter, David & Hughes, William (ed.) The Encyclopedia of the Gothic. Wiley, 2015
- Wells, Benjamin Willis. A Century of French Fiction. Dodd, Mead, 1898.
