= Télégraphe officiel des Provinces Illyriennes =

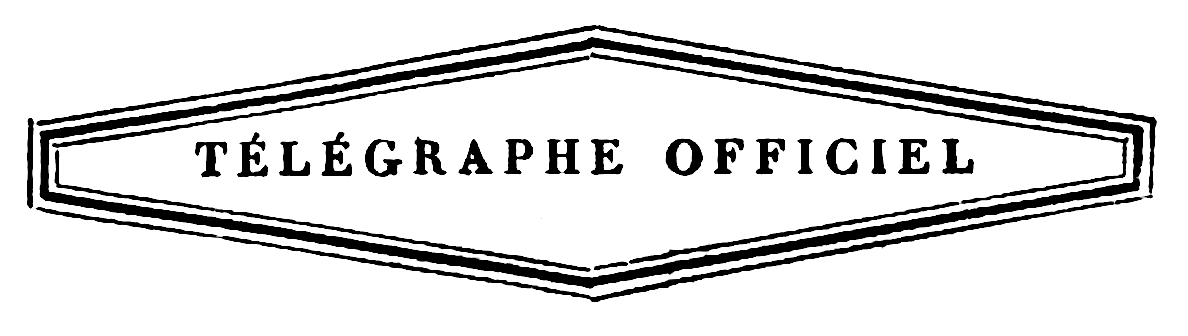
- Type: Bi-weekly multilingual newspaper
- Editor-in-chief: Charles Nodier (1813-14)
- Founded: October 1810
- Language: French, Italian, German, Illyrian
- Ceased publication: 1814
- Headquarters: Laibach, Illyrian Provinces

The Télégraphe officiel des Provinces Illyriennes was a multilingual bi-weekly newspaper published in Laibach from 1810 to 1814, during the period of French rule in the region.

== History ==
The Télégraphe officiel was founded in 1810 as part of a larger attempt to integrate the Illyrian Provinces within the French Empire and was overseen by the imperial government press in Laibach, headed by Josef Sardi. The newspaper was published in French, German, Italian, and Illyrian languages twice weekly (Wednesdays and Sundays at noon), and contained news never more than a week old directly from Paris. A subscription to the Télégraphe officiel cost 20 francs annually. The final chief editor of the paper was the notable romantic author Charles Nodier, whose tenure ended with the paper's dissolution (and the end of French rule) in 1814.
