= Marceline Desbordes-Valmore =

French poet and novelist (1786–1859)

Marceline Desbordes-Valmore (20 June 1786 – 23 July 1859) was a French Romantic poet and novelist.

== Early life and education ==
Desbordes-Valmore was born in Douai. Following the French Revolution, her father's business was ruined, and she traveled with her mother to Guadeloupe in search of financial help from a distant relative. Marceline's mother died of yellow fever there, and the young girl somehow made her way back to France. At age 16, back in Douai, she began a career on stage. In 1817 she married her husband, the "second-rate" actor Prosper Lanchantin-Valmore.

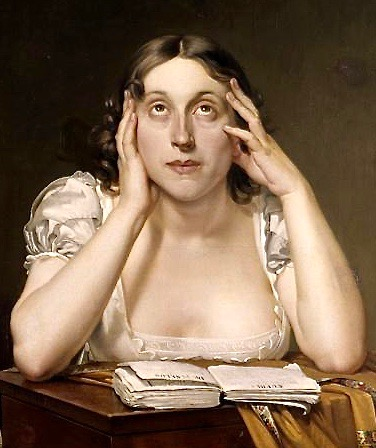
Constant-Joseph Desbordes: Marceline Desbordes-Valmore; Douai; detail

== Career ==
Desbordes-Valmore published Élégies et Romances, her first poetic work, in 1819. In 1821 she published the narrative work Veillées des Antilles. It includes the novella Sarah, a contribution to the genre of slave stories in France.

Desbordes-Valmore appeared as an actress and singer in Douai, Rouen, the Opéra-Comique in Paris, and the Théâtre de la Monnaie in Brussels, where she notably played Rosine in Beaumarchais's Le Barbier de Séville. She retired from the stage in 1823. She later became friends with the novelist Honoré de Balzac, and he once wrote that she was an inspiration for the title character of La Cousine Bette.

Desbordes-Valmore was a friend of the writer Louise Crombach, who introduced Desbordes-Valmore to Marie Pape-Carpantier. Their friendship ended after Crombach was prosecuted for lesbianism in 1845.

The publication of her innovative volume of elegies in 1819 marks her as one of the founders of French Romantic poetry. Her poetry is also known for taking on dark and depressing themes, which reflects her troubled life. She is the only female writer included in the famous Les Poètes maudits anthology published by Paul Verlaine in 1884. A volume of her poetry was among the books in Friedrich Nietzsche's library.

Robert de Montesquiou devoted a book-length study to her work, referring to her as "the Christian Sappho" [la Sappho chrétienne].

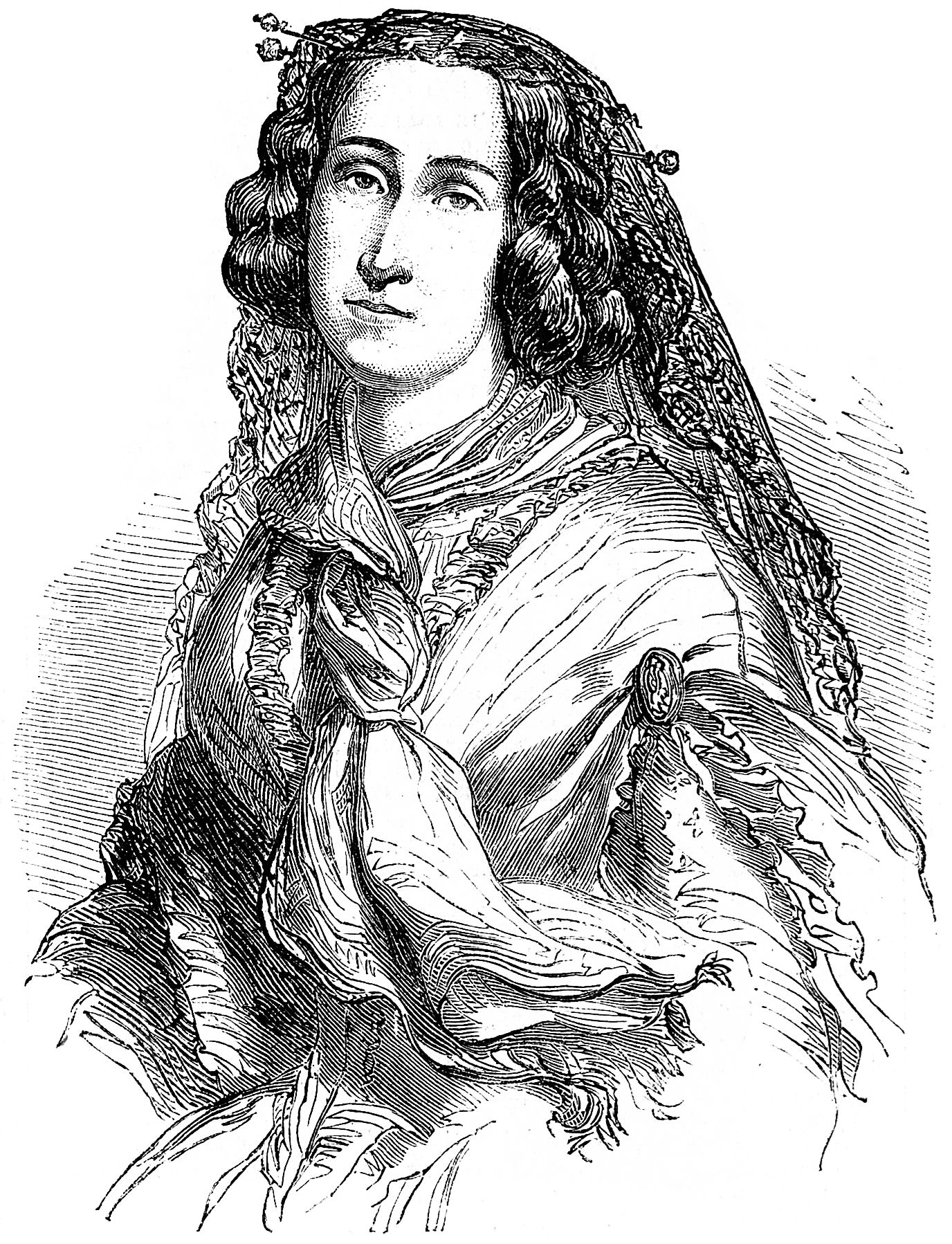
Marceline Desbordes-Valmore

== Bibliography ==
Each year links to its corresponding "[year] in poetry" article:

- 1819: Élégies et romances
- 1825: Élégies et poésies nouvelles
- 1833: Les Pleurs
- 1839: Pauvres Fleurs
- 1843: Bouquets et prières
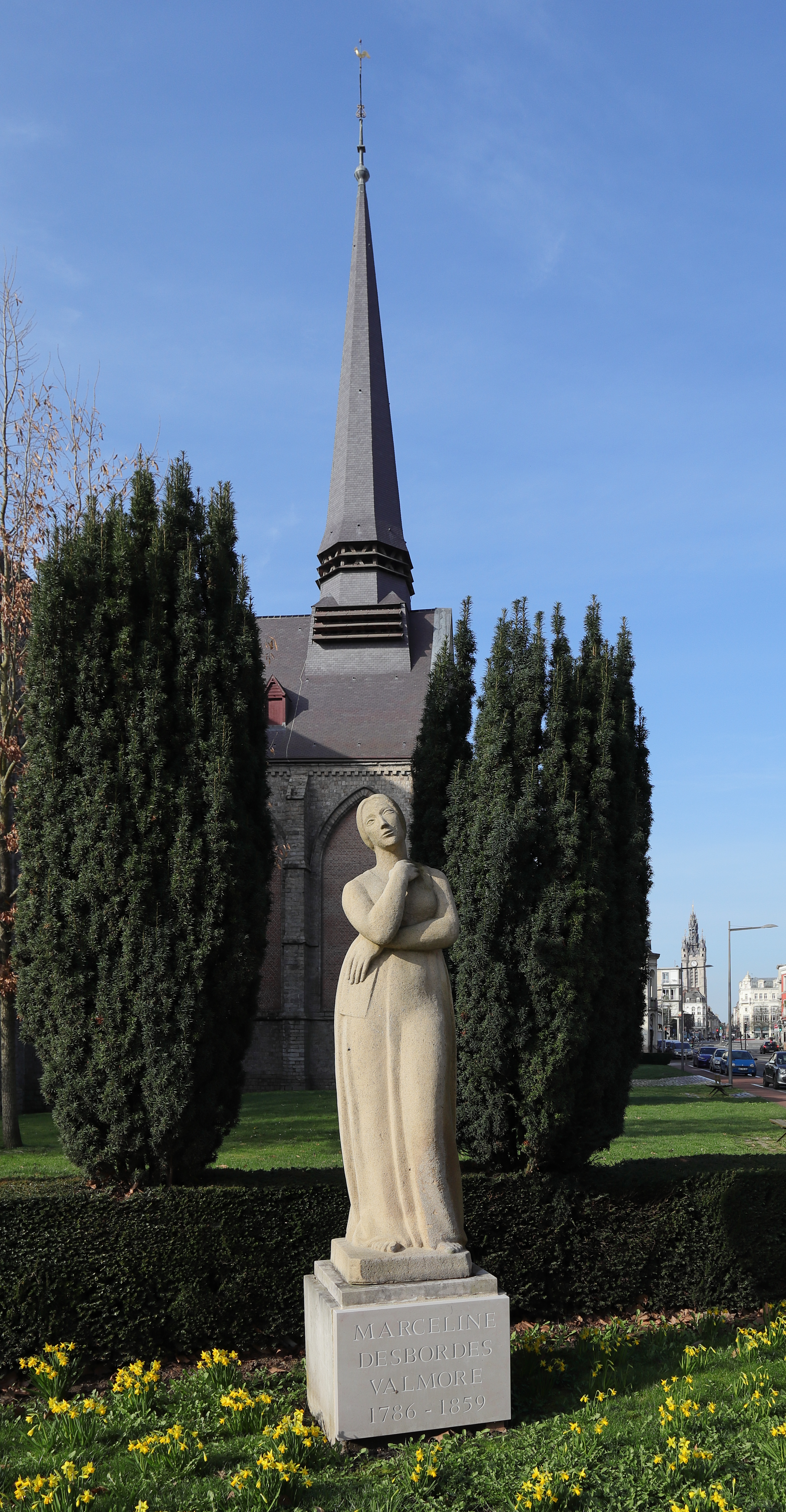
- Statue in Douai
  1860: Poésies inédites (posthumous)
