= Charles Nodier =

French author (1780–1844)

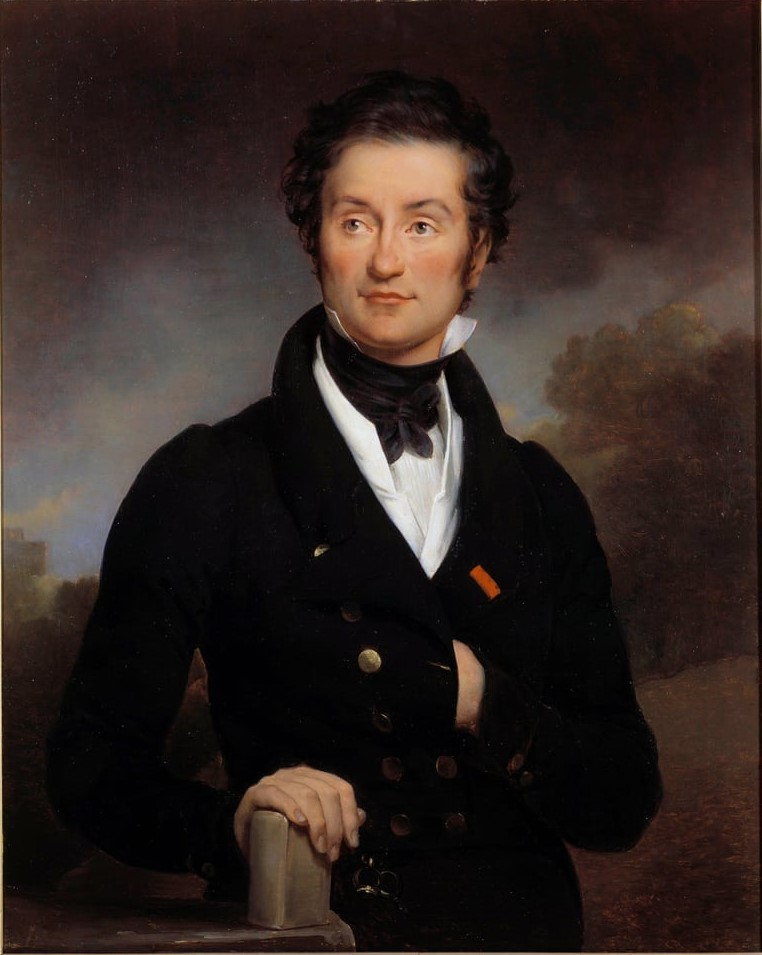
- Portrait of Charles Nodier (1844)
- Born: Jean Charles Emmanuel Nodier; 29 April 1780; Besançon, Franche-Comté, France
- Died: 27 January 1844 (aged 63); Paris, France
- Occupations: Writer; Librarian
- Years active: 1802–1844
- Relatives: Fanny Tercy (sister-in-law); Lucile Messageot (sister-in-law)

Jean Charles Emmanuel Nodier (French pronunciation: [ʒɑ̃ ʃaʁl emanɥɛl nɔdje]; 29 April 1780 – 27 January 1844) was a French author and librarian who introduced a younger generation of Romanticists to the conte fantastique, gothic literature, and vampire tales. His dream related writings influenced the later works of Gérard de Nerval.

== Early years ==
He was born at Besançon in France, near the border with Switzerland. His father, on the outbreak of the French Revolution, was appointed mayor of Besançon and consequently chief police magistrate, and seems to have become an instrument of the tyranny of the Jacobins without sharing their principles. But his son was for a time an ardent citizen, and is said to have been a Jacobin Club member at the age of twelve. In 1793 Charles saved the life of a lady guilty of sending money to an émigré, declaring to his father that if she were condemned he would take his own life. He was sent to Strasbourg, where he studied with Eulogius Schneider, the notorious Jacobin and public prosecutor of Alsace, but a good Greek scholar.

== Activism and wanderings ==
During the Reign of Terror his father put him under the care of Justin Girod-Chantrans, with whom he studied English and German. His love of books began very early, and he combined with it a strong interest in nature, which Girod-Chantrans was able to foster. He became librarian in his native town, but his exertions in the cause of suspected persons brought him under suspicion. An inspection of his papers by the police, however, revealed nothing more dangerous than a dissertation on the antennae of insects. Entomology continued to be a favourite study with him, but he varied it with philology and pure literature and even political writing. For a skit on Napoleon, in 1803, he was imprisoned for some months.

He then left Paris, where he had gone after losing his position at Besançon, and for some years lived a very unsettled life at Besançon, Dole, and in other places in the Jura. During these wanderings he wrote his novel, Le peintre de Salzbourg, journal des émotions d'un coeur souffrant, suivi des Meditations du cloître (1803). The hero, Charles, who is a variation of the Werther type, desires the restoration of the monasteries, to afford a refuge from the woes of the world. At Dole, on 31 August 1808, he married Désirée Charve. Their only daughter Marie-Antoinette-Élisabeth Mennessier-Nodier (1811 – 1893) became a noted woman of letters. Nodier was working as a secretary to the elderly Sir Herbert Croft, 5th Baronet and his platonic friend Lady Mary Hamilton. During this time he translated Hamilton's book Munster Village and helped her write La famille du duc de Popoli or The Duc de Popoli which was published in 1810.

In December 1812 Nodier moved to Ljubljana, then the capital of the newly established French Illyrian Provinces, and was in 1813 the last editor of a multilingual newspaper, the Official Telegraph of the Illyrian Provinces (Télégraphe officiel des Provinces Illyriennes) published in French, German and Italian. It was there that Nodier composed, in 1812, the first draft of his novel Jean Sbogar. The story about a love between a brigand and a daughter of a rich merchant was finally published in 1818. After the evacuation of French forces from the Illyrian provinces in 1813 he returned to Paris, and the Restauration found him a royalist, though he retained something of republican sentiment. In 1824 he was appointed librarian of the Bibliothèque de l'Arsenal, a position that he kept for the rest of his life. He was elected a member of the Académie française in 1833, also of the Société Entomologique de France when this was formed in 1832, and he was made a member of the Legion of Honour. He died, aged, 63, in Paris.

The twenty years at the Arsenal were the most important and fruitful of Nodier's career. He had the advantage of a settled home in which to collect and study rare and unusual books; and he was able to establish a celebrated literary salon, known as Le Cénacle, rallying a knot of young literary men to romanticism (the so-called Romanticists of 1830), some of whom would achieve great renown themselves. Victor Hugo, Alfred de Musset, and Sainte-Beuve all acknowledged their obligations to him, and Alexandre Dumas incorporated his recollections of Nodier into his novelette La Dame au Collier de Velours. The group included Alphonse de Lamartine, Gérard de Nerval, and Louise Crombach. Nodier was a passionate admirer of Goethe, Laurence Sterne and Shakespeare, and himself contributed to the literature that was one of the leading traits of the Romantic school. Other members of Le Cénacle who Nodier knew included Hector Berlioz, George Sand and Franz Liszt who would perform there regularly.

== Works ==
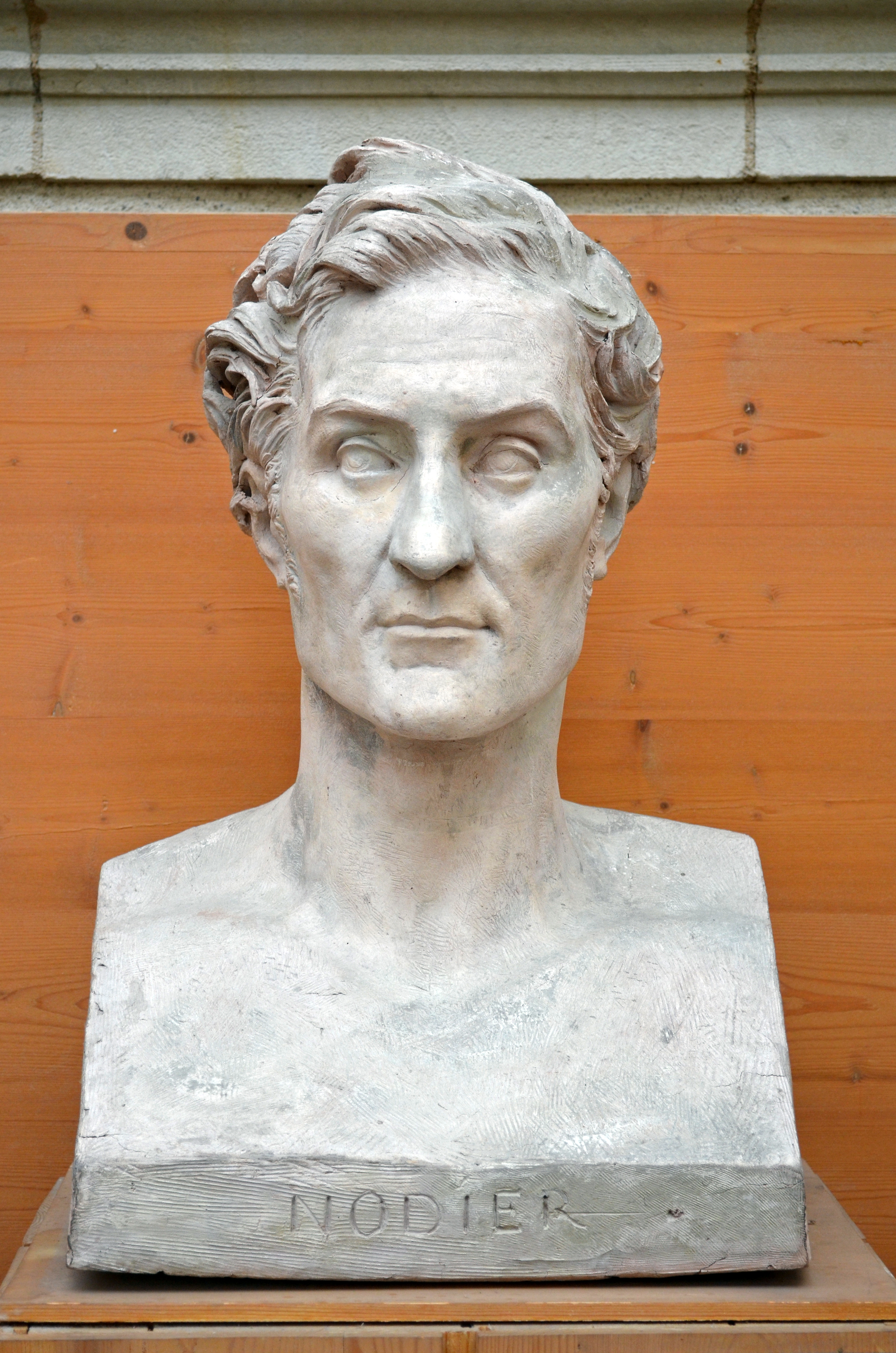
Bust of Charles Nodier by David d'Angers (1845).

His best and most characteristic work, which is exquisite in its kind, consists partly of short tales of a more or less fantastic character, partly of nondescript articles, half bibliographic, half narrative, the nearest analogue to which in English is to be found in some of the papers of Thomas De Quincey. The best examples of the latter are to be found in the volume entitled Mélanges tirés d'une petite bibliothèque, published in 1829 and afterwards continued. Of his tales the best are Infernaliana (1822); Smarra, ou les démons de la nuit (1821); Trilby, ou le lutin d'Argail (1822); Histoire du roi de Bohême et de ses sept châteaux (1830); La Fée aux miettes (1832); Inès de las Sierras (1837); Les quatre talismans et la légende de soeur Béatrix (1838), together with some fairy stories published in the year of his death, and Franciscus Columna, which appeared after it. The Souvenirs de jeunesse (1832) are interesting but untrustworthy, and the Dictionnaire universel de la langue française (1823), which, in the days before Littré, was one of the most useful of its kind, is said to have been not wholly or mainly Nodier's. There was a so-called collection of Œuvres complêtes published in 12 vols. in 1832, but at that time much of the author's best work had not yet appeared, and it included but a part of what was previously published. Nodier found an indulgent biographer in Prosper Mérimée on the occasion of the younger man's admission to the academy.

During the 1820s, after adapting Dr. John William Polidori's short story "The Vampyre" successfully for the stage in France (Le Vampire, 1820), Nodier involved himself in the theatre for a few years. Among these works were Bertram ou le Pirate (1822), based on a play by Charles Maturin in England (Bertam, or The Castle of St. Aldobrand), and Le Monstre et le Magicien (1826), which adapted an English play based on Mary Shelley's novel Frankenstein. Nodier also translated and adapted an Italian play by Carmillo Frederici (Le Delateur-The Informer) in 1821. Despite the success of these works, he lost interest in the theatre, and by the late eighteen twenties devoted himself entirely to literature, mostly to the conte fantastique.

An account of his share in the Romantic movement is to be found in Georg Brandes's Main Currents in Nineteenth Century Literature. Nodier's Description raisonnée d'une jolie collection de livres (1844), which is a catalogue of the books in his library, contains a life by Francis Wey and a complete bibliography of his numerous works. See also Sainte-Beuve, Portraits littéraires, vol. ii.; Prosper Mérimée, Portraits historiques et littéraires (1874); and A Estignard, Correspondance inédite de Charles Nodier, 1796–1844 (1876), containing his letters to his childhood friend and fellow enthusiast in literature, Charles Weiss.

A collection of Nodier's dream writings (De Quelques Phénomènes Du Sommeil) was published by Le Castor Astral in 1996.

== Musical adaptations of Nodier's Trilby ==
Nodier's 1822 novella Trilby; or, The Fairy of Argyll, provided the inspiration for the ballet La Sylphide, 1832, to a scenario devised by Adolphe Nourrit. In 1870, the novella was adapted for another ballet titled Trilby by the great choreographer Marius Petipa, balletmaster of the Tsar's Imperial Ballet of St. Petersburg, Russia.

The libretto of John Barnett's 1834 opera The Mountain Sylph is also adapted from Trilby, via the ballet La Sylphide.

== Commemoration ==
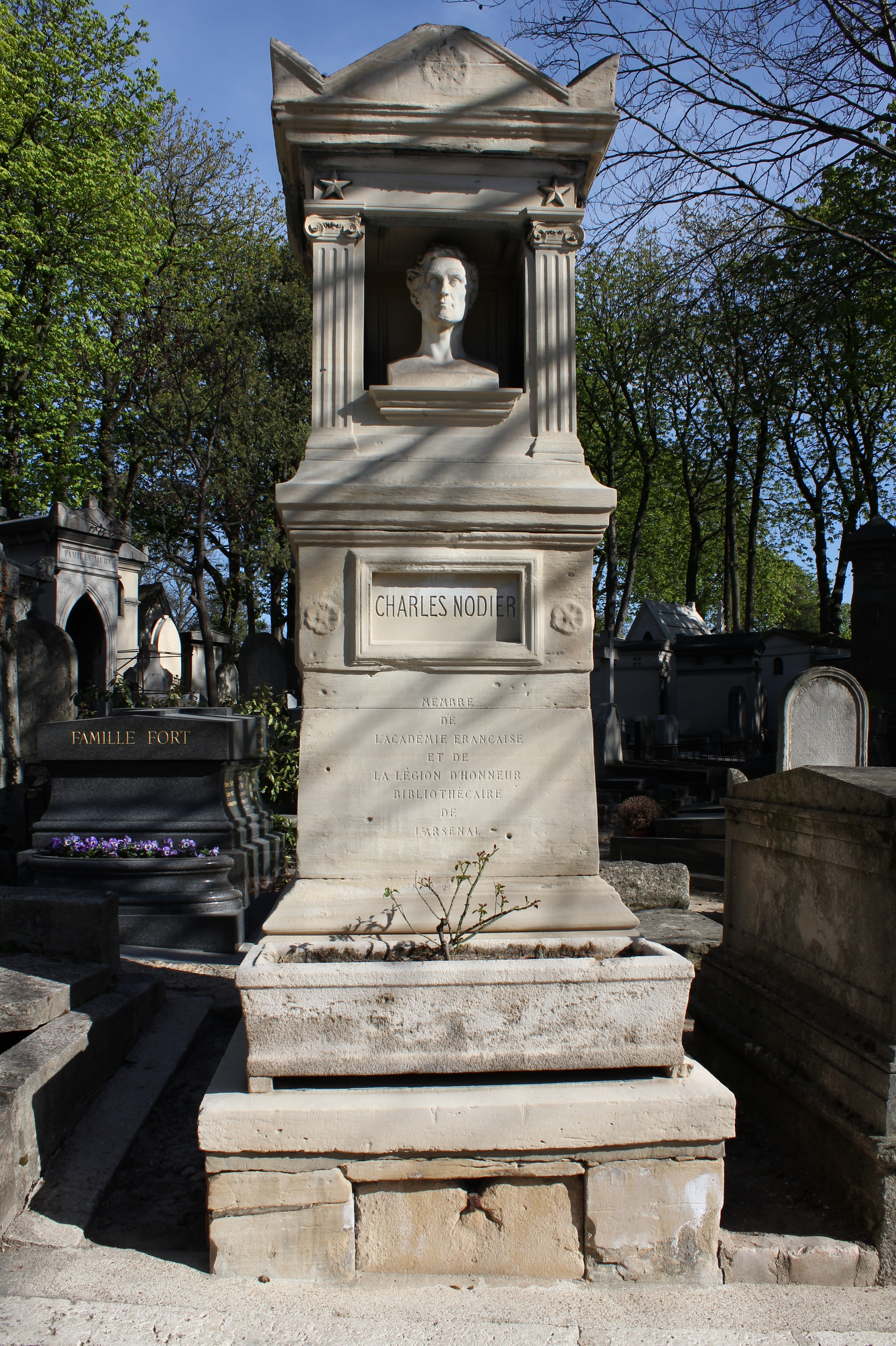
Nodier's grave at Père Lachaise cemetery, (49th division)

There are streets in France named after Charles Nodier, located in Montmartre Paris, Pantin, Reims and Besançon.

The centre of French science and culture in Ljubljana, established in December 1966, was in 1983 named the Charles Nodier French Cultural Centre (now the Charles Nodier French Institute). It is housed on the left bank of the Ljubljanica, between the Prešeren Square and the St. James' Bridge. From 1994 to 2008, the institute regularly published a bulletin titled Le Petit Nodier. Since 1985, a bronze bust of Nodier stands at the court of its building, work of Jakov Brdar, according to the plans by the architect Marjan Ocvirk. It is a vivid portrait with a sharp look and some traces of the Secession style.

== Selected works ==
=== Fiction and creative writings ===
- Stella, ou Les Proscrits (1802) – (Stella or The Exiles) – a juvenile novel which was subsequently abandoned by the author in his several collected works.
- Le Dernier Chapitre de Mon Roman (1803) – (The Last Chapter of My Novel) – a short novel.
- Le Peintre de Salzbourg, Journal des Émotions d'un Cœur Souffrant (1803) – (The Painter of Salzbourg, Journal of a Suffering Heart) – a novel.
- Les Tristes, ou mélanges tirés des tablettes d'un suicidé (1806) – a collection of death-haunted romantic writings which includes Nodier's first conte fantastique, "Un Heure, ou la Vision"; and the poetic essay "Les Méditations du Cloître", which was inspired by Chateaubriand.
- Le Chant des Morlaques (1814) – (The Song of the Morlachs) – a short poetic essay that has been included in a collection of Nodier's dream writings.
- Contes fantastiques (1814) – a fantasy short stories collection.
- Jean Sbogar, Histoire d'un Bandit Illyrien Mysterious (1818) – a full-length novel. A gothic political romance mostly set in Illyria.
- Thérèse Aubert, Roman d'Amour Pendant les Guerres Vendéennes (1819) – a love story set in the wake of the French Revolution, it is in the form of a novella.
- Le Vampire (1820) – (The Vampire) – an atmospheric full-length theatrical play, freely adapting the story of John William Polidori.
- Adèle (1820) – written in the form of letters, a love story of novella length.
- Smarra, ou les Démons de la Nuit, conte fantastique (1821) – the author's most celebrated work, a remarkable novella, one of his dream writings, which features a vampire. The word "Smarra" was taken from the Dalmatian word for "Nightmare".
- Trilby, ou le Lutin d'Argail, conte fantastique (1822) – one of Nodier's best known works, an atmospheric adult fairy tale of novella length set in a Scottish landscape.
- Infernaliana (1822) – a book of little tales of ghosts and vampires, some of which were culled from earlier sources.
- Le Songe d'Or, ou Arlequin et l'Avare, Pantomime Anglais en 11 Tablaux (1828) – a pantomime for the theatre which was subsequently adapted into a short story in 1832.
- Mélanges tirés d'une petite bibliothèque (Paris: Crapelet, 1829)
- Histoire du Roi de Bohême et de ses Sept Châteaux (1830) – an experimental full-length novel.
- De Quelques Phénomènes du Sommeil (1831) – (Of Some Phenomena of Sleep) – a short journalist piece, one of Nodier's dream writings, also published under the title Le Pays des Rêves.
- M. de la Mettrie, ou les Superstitions (1831) – a short story which has been included in a collection of Nodier's dream writings.
- Souvenirs de Jeunesse (1832) – (Souvenirs of Youth) – a collection of novellas comprising "Séraphine", "Clémentine", "Amélie", and "Lucréce et Jeannette". Subsequent editions included "Thérèse". Dedicated to Alphonse de Lamartine.
- La Fée aux Miettes, conte fantastique (1832) – (The Crumb Fairy) – a full-length novel. A satirical adult fairy tale set in Scotland, it is one Nodier's most celebrated works.
- Mademoiselle de Marsan, conte fantastique (1832) – a gothic short novel.
- Jean-François les Bas-Bleus (1832) – a short story.
- Le Dessin de Piranèse (1833) – a descriptive essay that develops into one of Nodier's dream writings. A shorter version was published as Piranèse in 1836.
- Hurlubleu (1833) – a novella.
- La Combe de l'Homme Mort (1833) – a short weird horror story.
- Trésors des Fèves et Fleurs des Pois (1833) – a short story.
- M. Cazotte (1834) – a short story.
- Des Hallucinations et des Songes en Matière Criminelle (1835) – an essay which has been included in a collection of the author's dream writings.
- Paul ou le Resemblance (1836) – a short story.
- Inès de Las Sierras (1837) – a gothic novella set in a nocturnal storm. Alexandre Dumas complained to the author about the rationalization of this story in an addendum at its end, and Nodier conceded the point. This is recorded in Dumas' novella La Femme au Collier de Velours, which begins with a personal portrait and some reminiscences of Nodier and the Cėnacle.
- Les Quatre Talismans, et La Légende de Sœur Beatrix (1838) – two 'contes fantastiques,' a short novel and a short novella, the latter composed of Christian imagery.
- La Neuvaine de la Chandeleur, et Lydie (1839) – a novella and a short story.
- Franciscus Columna (1844) – a novella.

=== Some non-fiction works ===
- Dissertation sur l'Usage des Antennes dans les Insectes (1798) – (A Dissertation on the Use of Antennae in Insects).
- Pensées de Shakespeare Extraites de ses Ouvrages (1800) – (Thoughts of Shakespeare Taken from his Works) – a short essay.
- Bibliographie Entomologique (1801) – (Entomological Bibliography).
- Dictionnaire Raisonné des Onomatopées Françaises (1808) – (Reasoned Dictionary of French Onomatopoeia) – a dictionary of words derived from the sound associated with the subject (e.g. Cuckoo). A high point of the author's early years which was somewhat expanded in a new edition of the book in 1828.
- Questions de Littérature Légale (1812)
- Histoire des sociétés secrètes de l'armée : et des conspirations militaires qui ont eu pour objet la déstruction du gouvernement de Bonaparte. Paris : Gide fils, 1815. (Eds.) Nodier, Bazin, Didier, Lemare, Lombard; English trans. (2008) Cornerstone Book Publishers.
- Promenade de Dieppe aux Montagnes de l'Écosse (1821) – a book describing Nodier's travels through Britain including Scotland. His experience of the Scottish landscape inspired two of his best known works: Trilby and La Fée aux Miettes, which were set in Scotland.
- Essai sur le Gaz Hydrogène et les Divers Modes d'Éclairage Artificiel (1823) – (An Essay on Hydrogen Gas and the Various Methods of Artificial Lighting).
- Dictionnaire Universal de la Langue Française (1823) – (Universal Dictionary of the French Language).
- Mélanges Tirés d'une Petite Bibliothèque (1829)
- Du Fantastique en Littérature (1830) – a full-length study of the weird or fantastic in literature.
- Bibliographie des Fous: De Quelques Livres Excentriques (1835) – (Bibliography of the Mad: Of Some Eccentric Books).
- La Seine et ses Bords (1836–1837) – (The Seine and its banks) – a full-length description of the river and the geography of its banks. Illustrated by Marville and Foussereau.
- Description Raisonnée d'une Jolie Collection de Livres (1844) – (Reasoned Description of a Beautiful Collection of Books).

=== A contested novel ===
- Lord Ruthwen, ou Les Vampires (1820) – a rambling vampire novel based on earlier sources, a description of which is given at the end of the book. The overall theme is in the form of a sequel to Dr. John William Polidori's short story "The Vampyre", and the material suggests that it may originally have been intended as a play. The title page of the first edition attributed publishing to the author of Jean Sbogar and authorship to the pseudonym "C. B.", causing historians to speculate that the book was written by a contemporary vaudeville manager named Cyprien Bérard, with whom Nodier was associated. The sources for the stories suggest the knowledge of a librarian and a bibliophile, and the novel misspells the name Ruthven as occurred in the text of Promenade de Dieppe aux Montagnes de l'Écosse. There are features of Nodier's Jean Sbogar and Les Tristes in the novel, but the writing is hurried and lacks the quality of Nodier's other fictional works.
