= Jean-Guillaume-Antoine Cuvelier =

French playwright

- Born: 15 January 1766; Boulogne-sur-Mer
- Died: 25 May 1824 (aged 58)
- Occupation: Playwright

Jean-Guillaume-Antoine Cuvelier (15 January 1766 – 25 May 1824) was a French playwright, nicknamed the Crébillon of melodrama.

He first entered the military career then turned to theatre and was a rival of René Charles Guilbert de Pixérécourt. From 1793 to 1824, he authored an incredible number of melodramas, dramas, pantomimes, etc. many of which were met with great success: the number is more than 110 including the Fille sauvage, the Main de Fer, the Fille mendiante, Jean Sbogar, Machabées, and the Mort de Kleber.

- 1804: L'Officier cosaque, one-act comedy mingled with songs by Charles Dumonchau with Luigi Gianella and Jean-Guillaume-Antoine Cuvelier, Théâtre de la Porte-Saint-Martin, 9 April
- 1807: La lanterne de Diogène, pantomime équestre, music arranged by Guillaume Navoigille. Premiered at the opening of the Cirque olympique on 28 December 1807, Paris : Barba, 1808 .
- 1811: La Petite Nichon, ou La Petite Paysanne de la Moselle, petits tableaux in 1 action and 1 prologue by Pierre Villiers and Jean-Guillaume-Antoine Cuvelier, Théâtre de la Porte-Saint-Martin, 23 November
- 1814: Le Vieux de la montagne, ou Les Arabes du Liban, three-act melodrama in prose by Jean-Guillaume-Antoine Cuvelier, music by Louis Alexandre Piccinni, ballet by Rhénon, Théâtre de la Porte-Saint-Martin, 26 December
