= Pierre Villiers =

French author

Pierre Antoine Jean-Baptiste Villiers (10 March 1760 – 21 July 1849 in Paris) became a French playwright, journalist and poet. Already a chevalier of the Légion d'honneur, he was made chevalier of the Order of Saint Louis on 18 August 1822.

== Early life and the Revolution ==
In 1790, by his own testimony in Souvenirs d'un déporté, a collection of anecdotes published in 1802, for seven months he served as secretary to Maximilien de Robespierre, then living rue de Saintonge in Le Marais in Paris, copying several of his speeches and adjusting his spending or cohabited with him. Also the Mémoires by Charlotte de Robespierre mention Villiers.

A royalist, as a captain of dragoons he was injured on 10 August 1792 while defending the Palais des Tuileries. Similarly, following the Coup of 18 Fructidor an V, he was condemned to deportation but escaped proscription.

== Literary career ==
Reappearing in public after the coup, Villiers devoted himself to literary work as an author of comedies, dramas and plays in verse. He also published newspapers such as Les Rapsodistes au salon, ou les Tableaux en vaudevilles (1795–1796), in which he wrote criticisms of the Salon, Rapsodies du jour, ou Séances des deux conseils en vaudevilles (1796–1800), Le Chant du coq, ou le Nouveau Réveil du peuple, Le Chiffonnier, ou le Panier aux épigrammes (which is a sequel to Rapsodies), La Lyre d'Anacréon (1810–1811) and La Macédoine à la Rumfort, journal de littérature et de bienfaisance.

== Works ==
- 1795: Quelques idées sur l'éducation publique
- 1795: Discours prononcé par le citoyen Villiers, capitaine au troisième régiment de dragons et rapporteur du quatrième conseil militaire, séant au Palais de justice, établi pour juger le chef des Chouans, Cormatin et co-accusés, à la séance publique du 21 frimaire, an quatrième de la République française
- 1796: Portefeuille d'un chouan (with F.-M. Mayeur de Saint-Paul)
- 1796: L'Ombre de Malesherbes à Isnard, Cadroi et Durand-Maillane
- 1799: La Constitution en vaudeville, œuvre posthume d'un homme qui n'est pas mort, publiée par lui-même, et dédiée à Madame Buonaparte
- 1802: Souvenirs d'un déporté : pour servir aux historiens, aus romanciers, aux compilateurs d'ana, aux folliculaires, aux journalistes, aux feseurs de tragédies, des comédies, de vaudevilles, de drames, de mélodrames et de pantomimes dialoguées
- 1802: Manuel du voyageur à Paris, ou Paris ancien et moderne, contenant la description historique et géographique de cette capitale, de ses monuments, palais, édifices publics, jardins, spectacles, etc., de tout ce qui peut intéresser les étrangers; suivie de la liste des banquiers, (numerous reprints)
- 1804: Petites rapsodies
- 1806: Les Braves anciens et modernes, galerie comparée des maréchaux d'Empire et de quelques maréchaux de France, connétables et grands capitaines des derniers siècles de la monarchie française
- 1811: Scène lyrique en l'honneur de leurs Majestés impériales et royales, et du roi de Rome
- 1814: Le Rodeur, ou Choix historique, dramatique, anecdotique, critique et pas du tout politique d'odes, de chansons, de couplets, de bons mots
- 1824: La France militaire, ou Abrégé de l'histoire de la monarchie française, à l'usage des militaires, 2 vol.
- 1829: Douze Fables dédiées à Mgr le duc de Montpensier
- 1835: Les Deux Philippe, le premier apôtre et le premier roi des Français, 1er mai 1835
- 1836: Minerve, l'aiglon et le hibou, fable, 1er janvier 1836
- 1836: L'Enfant à baptiser. Au Roi, 1er mai 1836
- Le Hibou et la pie, allégorie à S.A.R. le duc de Montpensier, 1er janvier 1837
- 1837: Au Roi
- La Richesse, la volupté, la vertu, la santé. Allégorie. À S.A.R. Mme duchesse Hélène d'Orléans, 1er janvier 1839
- 1842: Épître à la mort
- 1842: Le Religieux de l'abbaye de la Trappe, soliloque

=== Theatre ===
- 1793: Cange ou le Commissionnaire bienfaisant, trait historique in one act (with Armand Gouffé)
- 1794: Les Dragons français et les hussards prussiens, little one-act play, in prose, mingled with couplets
- 1794: Les Bustes, ou Arlequin sculpteur, comedy in one act and in prose (with Armand Gouffé), Variétés, 17 ventôse an III)
- 1797: Bébée et Jargon, one-act rapsody, mingled with couplets, imitated from the opéra Médée, Théâtre Montansier, Palais-Royal, 28 March
- 1800: Forioso à Bourges, ou l'Amant funambule, one-act comédie en vaudeville
- 1801: La Guinguette, ou Réjouissances pour la paix, one-act comedy, in vaudevilles (with P.-J.-A. Bonel), Théâtre Montansier-Variétés, 29 pluviôse an IX)
- 1802: Bizarre, ou C'n'est pas l'Pérou, bizarrerie in one act (with Bonel and Claude-Jean Bédéno fils), Théâtre de la Gaîté
- 1803: Ardres sauvée, ou les Rambures, mélodrame héroïque et historique in three acts, extravaganza, in collaboration with J.-G.-A. Cuvelier), la Gaîté, 23 pluviôse an XI
- 1804: Le Charivari de Charonne, one-act tintamare, imitated from the Désastre de Lisbonne (with H. Pessey), la Gaîté, 14 frimaire an XIII)
- 1805: Les cosaques, ou le jeune Dodiski historical melodrama in three acts and in prose, la Gaîté, 13 vendémiaire an XIV)
- 1805: Félime et Tangut, ou le Pied de nez, three-act mélodrame-féerie (with H. Pessey), la Gaîté, 14 May
- 1805: Le Jeune d'Aubigné, ou la Nuit de la St-Barthélémy, three-act historical drama, in prose
- 1803: Le Médecin turc, one-act opéra bouffon (with Armand-Gouffé), Opéra-Comique, 27 brumaire an XII)
- 1803: 1 et 1 font onze, vaudeville épisodique in one act (with H. Chaussier), la Gaîté, 28 July
- 1804: Le Bouffe et le tailleur, opéra-bouffon in one act (with Armand Gouffé), Théâtre Montansier, 21 June
- 1805: La forteresse de Cotatis ou Zelaïde et Pharès, three-act melodrama, la Gaîté, prairial an XIII)
- 1807: Rodomont, ou le Petit Don Quichotte, mélodrame héroï-comique, in three acts (with Braziers fils and Armand Gouffé), la Gaîté, 7 March)
- 1808: La femme impromptu, opéra bouffon in one act in prose
- 1810: Le Valet sans maître, ou la Comédie sans dénouement, bluette in less than one act, in prose, mingled with couplets (with Armand Gouffé), Variétés, 28 July
- 1810: L'Auberge allemande, prologue in vaudevilles for L'Enfant et le grenadier, Salle des Jeux gymniques, 20 October
- 1810: L'Enfant et le grenadier, fait et tableaux historiques in two acts and à grand spectacle, Salle des Jeux gymniques, 20 October
- 1811: La Petite Nichon ou La petite paysanne de la Moselle, petits tableaux en une petite action et un petit prologue with Jean Cuvelier, Théâtre de la Porte-Saint-Martin, 23 November
- 1812: L'Enfant et la poupée, ou le Masque d'airain, tableaux en une action précédée d'un prologue en prose, Salle des Jeux gymniques, 27 February
- 1817: M. Beldam, ou la Femme sans le vouloir, one-act comedy (with Armand Gouffé),(Variétés, 25 September)
- 1818: Le Maréchal de Lowendal, ou la Prise de Berg-op-Zoom en 1747, one-act historical fact, Cirque olympique des frères Franconi, 25 April
- 1818: La Ferme des carrières, historical fact (with H. Franconi), Cirque olympique of the Franconi brothers, 25 November
- 1819: Catherine de Steinberg, ou le Déjeuner du duc d'Albe, one-act mimo-mélodrame, Cirque olympique of the Franconi brothers, 3 November
- 1819: Poniatowski, ou le Passage de l'Elster, three-act military mimodrama (with Franconi jeune), Cirque olympique, 11 December
- 1820: Ugolin, ou la Tour de la faim, three-act mimodrama (with Caigniez), Cirque olympique, 14 December
- 1821: Rosalba d'Arandês, three-act play, extravaganza (with Caigniez), Théâtre du Panorama dramatique, 23 November
- 1822: Le Passage des Thermopyles, two-act mi-modrame, Théâtre du Cirque olympique, 26 December
- 1824: Le Pied de nez, ou Félime et Tangut, six-act vaudeville féerie (with Désaugiers), Théâtre du Vaudeville, 5 April
