= Trilby, West Virginia =

Trilby
- Unincorporated community
- Location within the state of West Virginia Trilby (the United States)
- Coordinates: 39°14′48″N 80°56′40″W
- Country: United States
- State: West Virginia
- County: Ritchie
- Elevation: 778 ft (237 m)
- Time zone: UTC-5 (Eastern (EST))
  - Summer (DST): UTC-4 (EDT)
- GNIS ID: 1689074

Trilby was an unincorporated community in Ritchie County, West Virginia, United States.
