= Solange Dudevant =

French novelist (1828–1899)

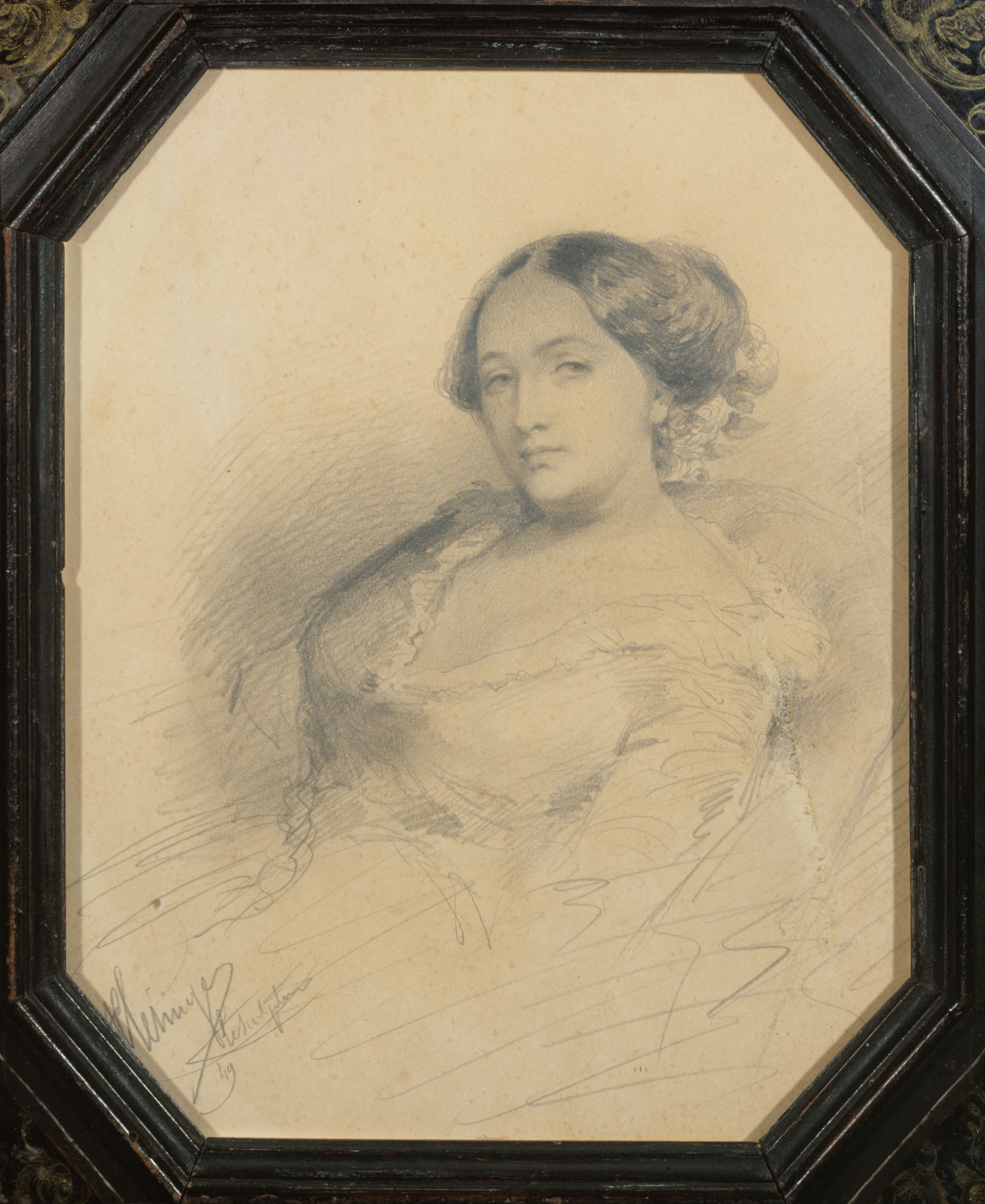
- Portrait by her husband Auguste Clésinger, 1849
- Born: 13 September 1828; Nohant-Vic, France
- Died: 17 March 1899 (aged 70); Paris, France
- Resting place: Cemetery at Nohant
- Occupation: Writer
- Spouse: Auguste Clésinger (m. 1847; div. 1852)
- Children: 2
- Parents: Casimir Dudevant ? (father); George Sand (mother)
- Relatives: Maurice Sand (brother)

Solange Dudevant (13 September 1828 – 17 March 1899) was a French writer and novelist and the daughter of George Sand.

== Biography ==
Solange Dudevant was born to author George Sand at Nohant on 13 September 1828. She was Sand's second child. Although Sand was married to Casimir Dudevant at the time, Solange's father was rumored to be Stéphane de Grandsagne.

Dudevant was tutored by the writer Louise Crombach.

In 1846 Solange became engaged to Fernand de Preaulx. But in 1847, she married the sculptor Auguste Clésinger, whom she met while posing for a bust. Solange was 18; the sculptor 32. The couple had a daughter, Jeanne, in 1848, but the child died a week after birth. A second daughter, also named Jeanne, was born in 1849. Nicknamed Nini, that child died in 1855 of scarlet fever.

Under the name Solange Clésinger-Sand, she published her first novel, Jacques Bruneau, in 1870. Her second book, Carl Robert, was published in 1887.

She died on 17 March 1899, at her home in Paris, and is buried in a private cemetery in Nohant-Vic.

== Works ==
- Jacques Bruneau, 1870
- Carl Robert, 1887
