= Maurice Sand =

French illustrator and writer (1823–1889)

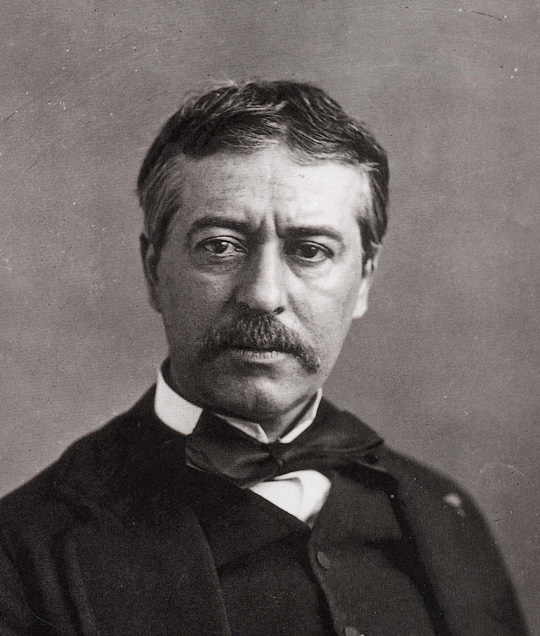
- Sand in the 1880s
- Born: Jean-François-Maurice-Arnauld Dudevant; 30 June 1823; Paris, France
- Died: 4 September 1889 (aged 66); Nohant-Vic, France
- Other name: Baron Dudevant
- Occupations: Writer; artist
- Spouse: Lina Calamatta
- Children: 2 daughters
- Parents: Casimir Dudevant (father); George Sand (mother)
- Relatives: Solange Dudevant (sister)

Jean-François-Maurice-Arnauld Dudevant, known as Baron Dudevant but better known by the pseudonym Maurice Sand (30 June 1823 – 4 September 1889), was a French writer, artist and entomologist. He studied art under Eugène Delacroix and also experimented in various other subjects, including geology and biology.

He was the elder child and only son of George Sand, a French novelist and feminist, and her husband, Baron François Casimir Dudevant. In addition to his numerous novels, he is best remembered for his monumental study of commedia dell'arte – Masques et bouffons (comédie italienne), 1860.

== Works ==
- Callirhoé, Paris, M. Lévy frères, 1864
- Catalogue raisonné des lépidoptères du Berry & de l'Auvergne, Paris, E. Deyrolle, 1879
- George Sand et le Théâtre de Nohant, Paris, les Cent une, 1930
- La Fille du singe, Paris, P. Ollendorff, 1886
- Le Coq aux cheveux d'or, Paris, Librairie Internationale, 1867
- Le Québec : lettres de voyage, 1862; réimp. Paris, Magellan & Cie, 2006 ISBN 978-2-35074-025-6
- Le Théâtre des marionnettes, Paris, Calmann Lévy, 1890
- L'Atelier d'Eugène Delacroix de 1839 à 1848, Paris, Fondation George et Maurice Sand, 1963
- L'Augusta, Paris, Michel Lévy frères, 1872
- Mademoiselle Azote. André Beauvray, Paris, Lévy, 1870
- Mademoiselle de Cérignan, Paris, Michel-Lévy frères, 1874
- Masques et bouffons (comédie italienne), texte et dessins, préf. George Sand, 1860
- Miss Mary, Paris, Michel Lévy frères, 1868
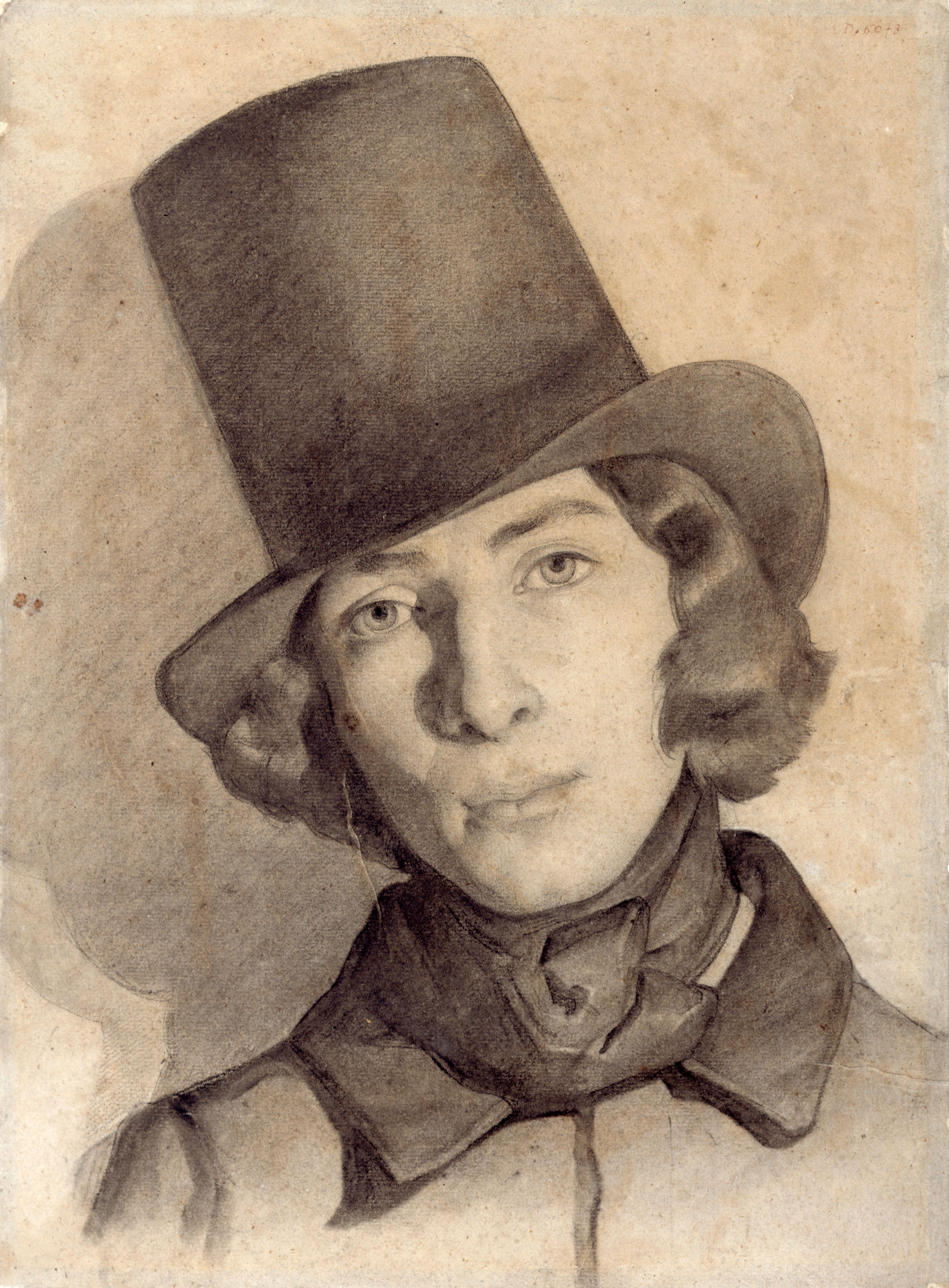
- Portrait de Maurice Sand
  Raoul de la Chastre : aventures de guerre et d'amour, Paris, M. Lévy frères, 1865
- Recueil des principaux types créés avec leurs costumes sur le théâtre de Nohant, [S.l. s.n.], 1846–1886
- Six mille lieues à toute vapeur, Paris, M. Lévy frères, 1873; réimp. Paris, Guénégaud, 2000 ISBN 978-2-85023-098-1
- Le Monde des Papillons, préface de George Sand, suivi de l'Histoire naturelle des Lépidoptères d'Europe par A. Depuiset, Paris, Rothschild, 1867
