= T. Trilby =

French novelist

T. Trilby, pseudonym of Thérèse de Marnyhac (July 12, 1875, Paris – November 11, 1962, La Rochelle), was a French novelist. She also used the pseudonyms M^{me} Louis Delhaye (her married name) and Marraine Odette.

== Biography ==
Her father was a merchant in Paris. She had a strict upbringing and education. During WWI, she was a nurse working for the Red Cross and received the Legion of Honour. When the war was over, she continued to work for the Red Cross and looked after young girls in difficulty.

In 1899, she married Louis Delhaye (b. 1868), an industrialist. They had a son.

She wrote novels, mainly for young people, as well as novels for young women. In the later stage of her career from 1935 to 1961, her novels were illustrated by Manon Iessel.

Of an optimistic and enthusiastic nature, Trilby wished, through her writings, to transmit to children and young people the moral values which have been taught to her: admiration of the army, colonialist spirit, support of the Croix-de-Feu, hostility to Popular Front (in Bouboule chez les Croix-de-feu (1936) and in Bouboule et le Front populaire (1937)). Her novels L'Inutile sacrifice (1922) and La Roue du moulinand (1926) were published in the ''Collection Stella'' of the French women's magazine Le Petit Écho de la Mode.

Two of her novels earned awards from the Académie française: Le Retour (Prix Monition in 1920) and En avant. Le petit roi des forains (Prix Sobrier-Arnould in 1949).

Since 1993, the Éditions du Triomphe have reissued 35 of her works.

Paul Renard, author of L'Action française et la vie littéraire (1931-1944), described her as a romancière d'extrême droite (novelist of the far-right).

== Selected publications ==
- 1903 : Vicieuse
- 1904 : Flirteuse
- 1904 : Petites oies blanches
- 1905 : Sans Dieu
- 1906 : L'Assistée
- 1910 : Odette de Lymaille, femme de lettres
- 1910 : La Petiote
- 1910 : Printemps perdu
- 1912 : La Transfuge
- 1917 : Arlette, jeune fille moderne
- 1919 : Ninette infirmière
- 1919 : Le Retour
- 1921 : Rêve d'amour
- 1922 : L'Impossible Rédemption
- 1922 : L'Inutile sacrifice - Collection Stella No. 61
- 1922 : Le Mauvais Amour
- 1924 : Zab et Zabeth
- 1925 : Le Droit d'aimer
- 1925 : Jacqueline, ou la Bonne action
- 1925 : L'Incomprise
- 1926 : La Roue du moulin - Collection Stella No. 144 (1926)
- 1926 : Monique, poupée française, adapted for cinema in 1928 under the title La Faute de Monique
- 1927 : Aimer, c'est pardonner
- 1927 : La Jolie Bêtise
- 1927 : Bouboule, ou Une cure à Vichy
- 1928 : Amoureuse espérance
- 1928 : Marie-Pierre au volant, ou la Grande aventure
- 1928 : Une toute petite aventure
- 1929 : Marise, fille de la liberté
- 1929 : La Petite Parfumeuse
- 1929 : Princesse de Riviera
- 1930 : La Vie sentimentale de M^{me} Noiraude
- 1931 : Bouboule, dame de la III^{e} République
- 1931 : Jacqueline, ou la Bonne action
- 1931 : Deux cœurs
- 1931 : Pantins et marionnettes
- 1932 : Deux pigeons s'aimaient d'amour tendre
- 1933 : Tour par amour
- 1933 : Bouboule en Italie
- 1933 : Bouboule à Genève
- 1934 : Furette, ou la Rançon
- 1935 : Bouboule dans la tourmente
- 1935 : Fred, ou la Lune de miel
- 1935 : Lulu le petit roi des forains
- 1936 : Moineau, la petite libraire
- 1936 : Bouboule chez les Croix de feu
- 1936 : Fred, ou l'Amour et ses merveilles
- 1936 : Dadou gosse de Paris
- 1937 : Poupoune au pays des navets
- 1937 : Le Petit Roi malgré lui
- 1937 : Bouboule et le Front populaire
- 1938 : Des fleurs et un cœur
- 1938 : Une sainte, des démons et Kiki
- 1938 : Titi la Carotte et sa princesse
- 1939 : D'un palais rose à une mansarde
- 1939 : L'Exil sans retour
- 1940 : Coco de France
- 1941 : La Peur du rêve
- 1941 : Le Grand Monsieur Poucet
- 1942 : Le passé est ton maître
- 1943 : Madame Carabosse
- 1943 : Toujours plus haut
- 1944 : La Petite Maréchale
- 1945 : Totor et Cie
- 1945 : À tout péché miséricorde
- 1946 : La Grande Découverte
- 1946 : Florette ou la Rivière des parfums
- 1946 : Le Messager victorieux
- 1947 : Louna la petite Chérifa
- 1947 : Les Trois Lumières
- 1948 : Fleuris où tu es semée
- 1948 : En avant ! (Prix de l'Académie française)
- 1948 : Lulu, le petit roi des forains (Prix de l'Académie française)
- 1949 : Petites filles modernes
- 1949 : La Princesse Mimosa
- 1949 : Délivrez-nous du mal
- 1949 : Mälasika, petit prince hindou
- 1950 : Au clair de la lune
- 1950 : Fantaisie en sol mineur
- 1951 : L'Invitation au bonheur
- 1951 : Le Petit Monsieur Vincent
- 1952 : Vacances et Liberté
- 1952 : Les Ravisseurs
- 1953 : L'Amour et ses précieuses victimes
- 1953 : Le Capitaine Gribouillard
- 1954 : Boule d'or et sa dauphine
- 1954 : Mais… l'amour vint
- 1954 : Il y a toujours un lendemain
- 1954 : Princesse de rêve et d'infortune
- 1955 : Cordon s'il vous plaît
- 1955 : La Messe pour les jeunes
- 1955 : Cœurs en grève
- 1956 : Kounto et ses amis''
- 1956 : Donnez-moi la puissance d'aimer
- 1956 : La Grande Patronne
- 1956 : Paris-Londres
- 1957 : Il était un petit chat, conte moderne
- 1957 : La Maison sans âme
- 1957 : Savoir aimer
- 1957 : Riki demoiselle de la légion d'honneur
- 1958 : Les Associés du petit Noël
- 1958 : Pique-la-Lune
- 1958 : Risque-Tout, Président du Conseil
- 1959 : La Princesse héritière
- 1959 : Marion la Vedette
- 1960 : Leurs excellences Zoupi et Zoupinette
- 1960 : Une vie, un rêve
- 1961 : Casse-Cou ou la miraculeuse aventure

== Sources ==
- Trilby, un auteur à succès pour la jeunesse, Karine-Marie Voyer, Éditions du Triomphe, 1997, broché, 93 p., ISBN 9782843780097.
- Grand annuaire des littérateurs, des compositeurs de musique et des artistes peintres et sculpteurs, Paris, J. Denolly, 1922.
- Diament, Nic (1993). Dictionnaire des écrivains français pour la jeunesse, 1914-1991. Paris: L'École des loisirs. ISBN 2-211-07125-2; 783 pages.
- Bibliothèque nationale de France (See "Accès au catalogue général de la BnF".)
- Biographie de T. Trilby
