= Cénacle =

Parisian literary group

Cénacle is the name given to a Parisian literary group of varying constituency that began about 1826 to gather around Charles Nodier. The group sought to revive in French literature the old monarchical spirit, the spirit of medieval mystery and spiritual submission. The chief members were Vigny and the brothers Deschamps. They were soon joined by Lamartine, Hugo, and Sainte-Beuve, who describes the group as "royalists by birth, Christians by convention and a vague sentimentality." Other notable participants included Alfred de Musset, Prosper Mérimée, and Alexandre Dumas the Elder. Over time, particularly following the Revolution of 1830, the members’ attitudes evolved. Théophile Gautier and Gérard de Nerval joined the group around this period, but the original purpose of the Cénacle gradually faded, culminating with the success of Hugo's Hernani in 1830. The group also included women, such as the writer Louise Crombach.
