= Trilby, or the Fairy of Argyll =

1822 literary fairy tale novella by Charles Nodier

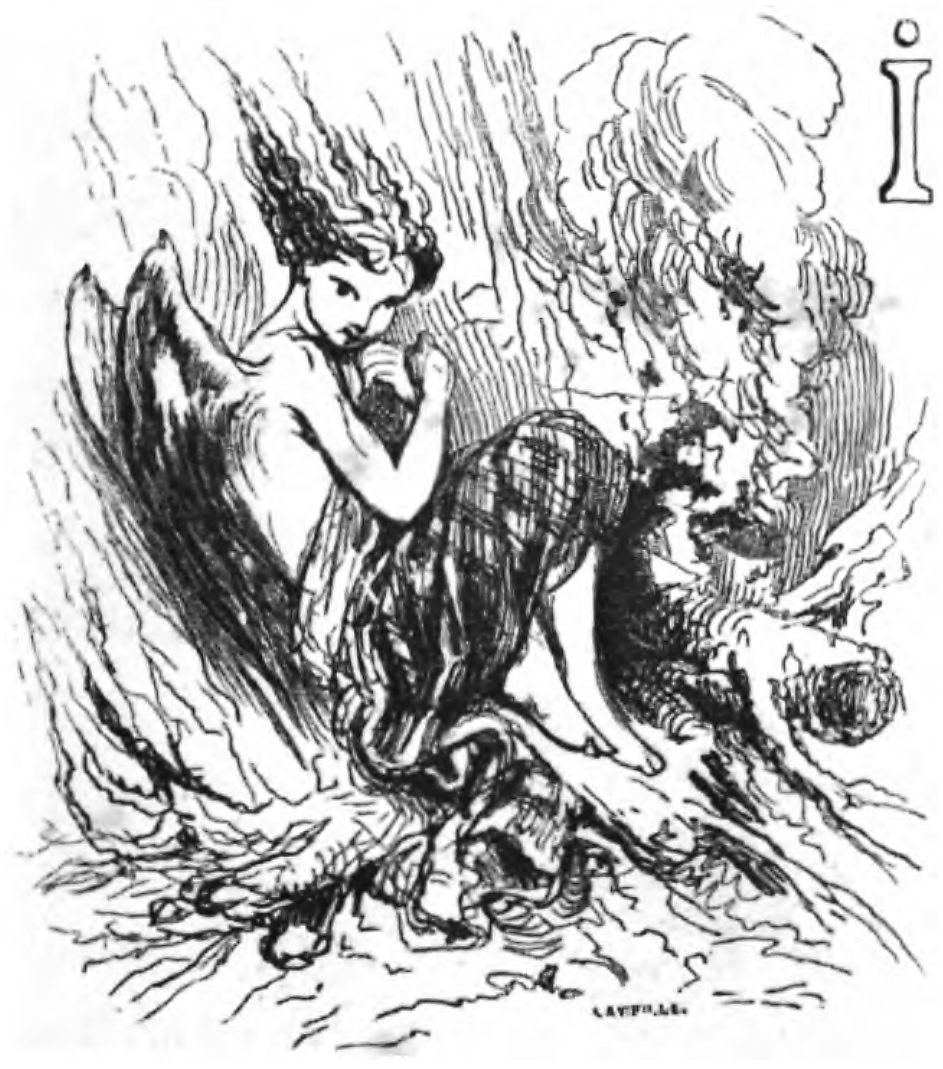
Trilby Initial i, from Contes de Charles Nodier, 1859, engraved by Tony Johannot

Trilby, or the Fairy of Argyll (French: Trilby, ou le lutin d’Argail) is an 1822 literary fairy tale novella by French author Charles Nodier (1780–1844). In it, a Scottish household spirit falls in love with the married woman of the house, who at first has him banished, then misses him, and eventually returns his love, both of them dying at the end. It was a popular work of the Romantic movement, published in multiple editions and translations. It also gave birth to adaptations as multiple ballets, including La Sylphide, and Trilby, and the opera The Mountain Sylph, some of which only retained the basic idea of love between a fairy and a Scottish peasant, but otherwise greatly diverged from the original plot.

== Plot ==
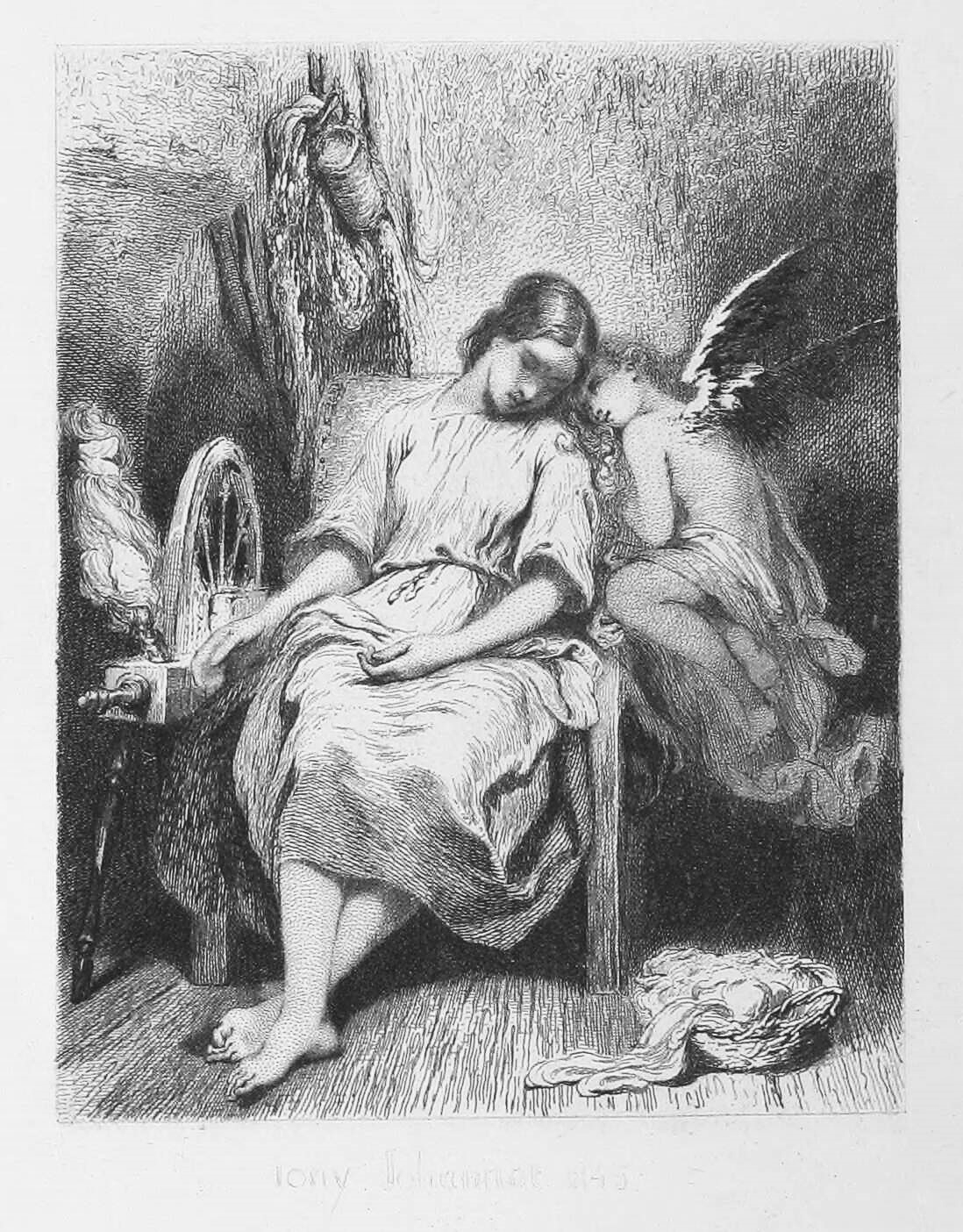
A half-dreaming Jeanie and Trilby

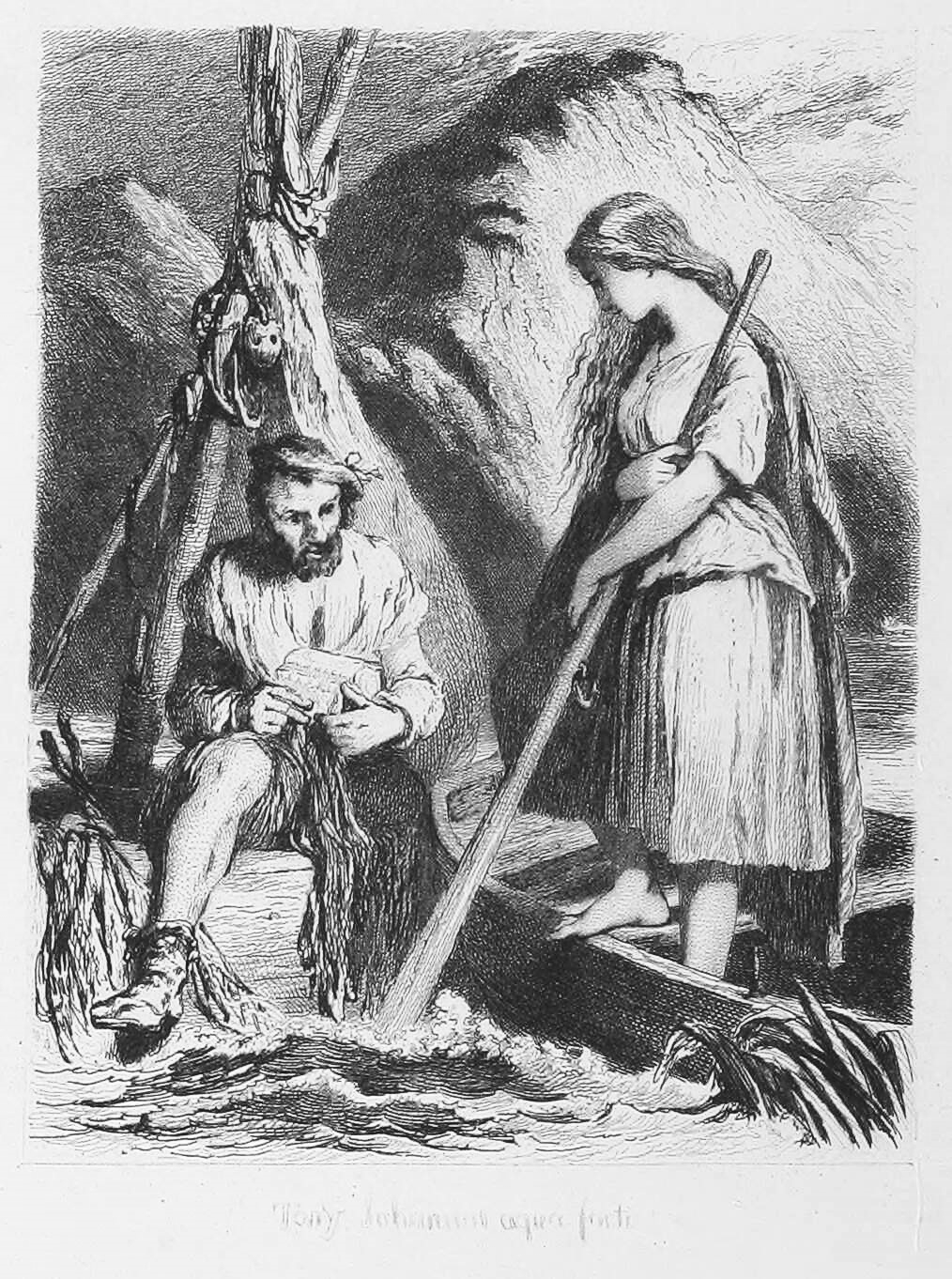
Dougal and Jeanie and the casket

From Contes de Charles Nodier, 1846, engraved by Tony Johannot

Trilby is a Scottish household spirit living in the hearth of Dougal the fisherman and his boatwoman wife Jeanie. Trilby alternates between taking care of the cottage and boats and playing tricks. He is in love with Jeanie, but only appears when she is half dreaming. When she tells Dougal about him, Dougal calls Ronald, a monk of Balva monastery, who pronounces an exorcism: if Trilby does not leave the cottage, Ronald will bind him in a birch tree in the burial ground for a thousand years. Trilby is not seen again. Jeanie misses him, and dreams of him not as a mischievous child-like being, but as a handsome youthful chief of Clan MacFarlane, who was exiled for disobeying the monks of Balva. Without Trilby, Dougal has bad luck in fishing.

A year after the exorcism, Dougal and Jeanie join a pilgrimage to pray to Saint Columba at Balva monastery, where Dougal means to pray for treasure in a precious casket, and Jeanie to forget Trilby. There, Ronald tells the pilgrims that most of the MacFarlane family is cursed for refusing to pay tribute to the monks, that charity or mercy towards evil is a sin, and asks them to join him in pronouncing a curse on all the spirits of Scotland. Jeanie unveils a painting of John Trilby MacFarlane in the monastery which she recognizes as Trilby, and instead prays to Saint Columba for support for her charity, her decision not to curse Trilby.

A little old man hires Jeanie to boat him to Dougal's cottage, and during the trip says that he is Trilby's father. When Jeanie admits that Trilby has been banished, due to her, but that she loves him, the man reveals himself as Trilby, and says that Columba was his brother, so her prayers drew him back; he is not afraid of a thousand years of captivity. Trilby jumps overboard when Dougal appears with a jeweled ivory casket that his nets found in the lake. Jeanie brings the casket home, and hears Trilby's voice from within it, asking her to admit she loves him, which will release him from the box, but she refuses, to be faithful to her marriage vows. Ronald comes to visit Dougal, and Jeanie sees them praying at the burial ground by a great birch tree dedicated to the Saint, from which she hears Trilby's voice dying away. She throws herself into an open grave and dies. Her gravestone is marked with her last words, "A thousand years are but a moment to those who are never meant to be separated."

== Analysis ==
Trilby is a fantasy of the Romantic movement, popular in 1800–1850, which supported emotion over modern society. The monk Ronald represents society's authority, in banishing the imp Trilby, and ordering the community to join him in a malediction against the spirits. Jeanie, however, favors emotion, at first charity, mercy towards Trilby (which Ronald says is a sin, a contradiction as charity is a traditional Christian virtue), then feels love towards him, despite her marital vows. The revelation that the MacFarlanes were economic rivals of the monks points out Ronald's hypocrisy. Dougal is representative of a different facet of society, greed, as he is so interested in the jeweled casket that he does not notice that he is losing his wife's love. In dying, Jeanie both loses and wins, as she escapes from society and believes she will outlast it and eventually be reunited with Trilby.

== Writing history ==
In the spring of 1821, Nodier, with three friends, left France to travel to Ben Lomond, in Scotland, the home of his literary idol Sir Walter Scott. He did not meet Scott there, but still published a book, Promenade de Dieppe aux montagnes d’Écosse (A Journey from Dieppe to the Scottish Highlands) about the trip after returning, which was successful enough to have an English translation. In the preface to Trilby, Nodier acknowledged his inspiration for writing the story to come from his travels to the Scottish Highlands, and said the subject came from a preface or note to one of Scott's novels. He also admitted to taking liberties with the Scottish place names to make them more euphonious in French, writing Argail for Argyll and Balva for Balvaig, since this was a work of imagination rather than fact.

Trilby was well received in France. Literary critic Charles Augustin Sainte-Beuve praised its style. Author Victor Hugo's book of poems Odes et Ballades (1828) included a 13 stanza elegiac poem, À Trilby, le lutin d’Argail, dated April 1825, addressed to the character and mourning his suffering.

== Adaptations ==
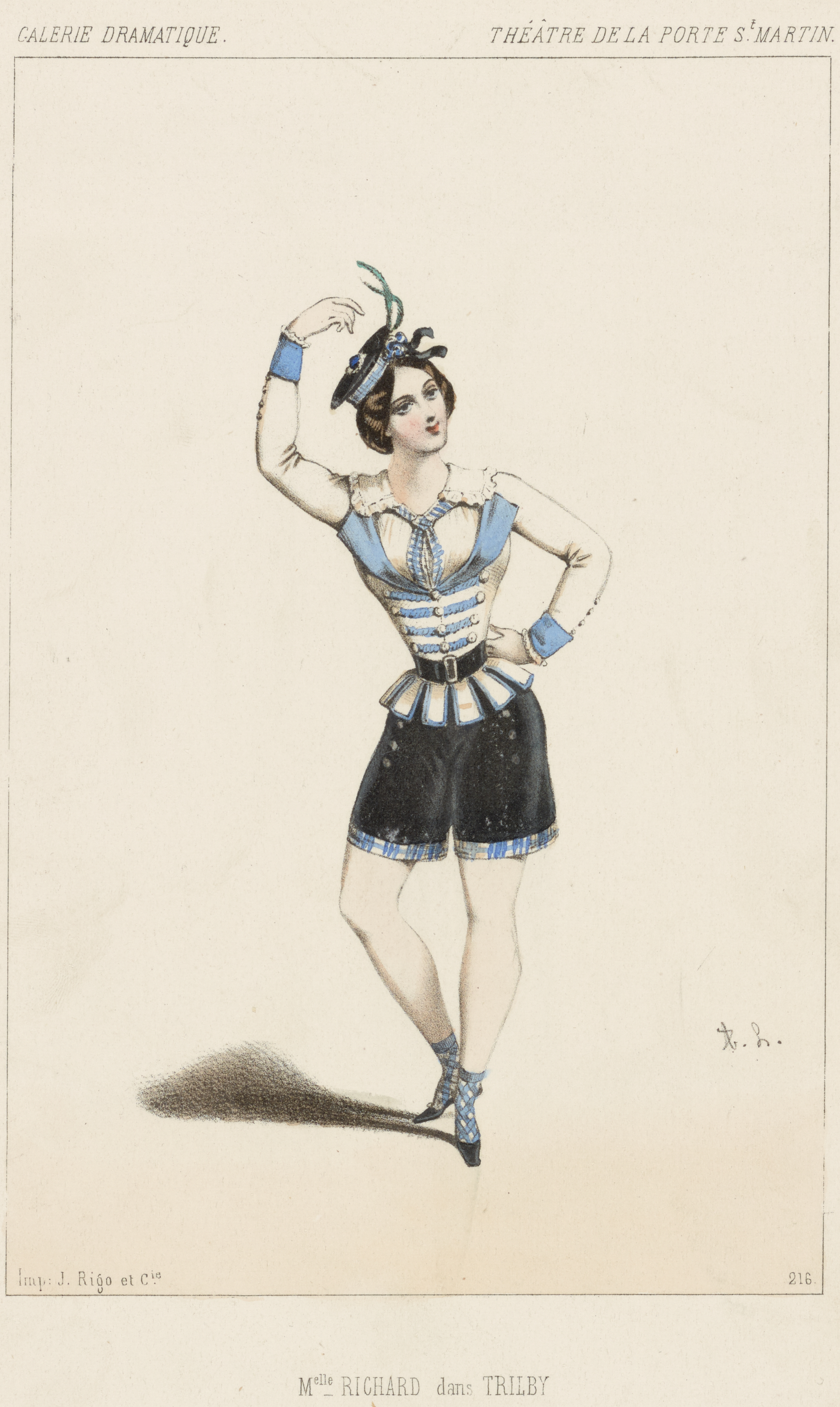
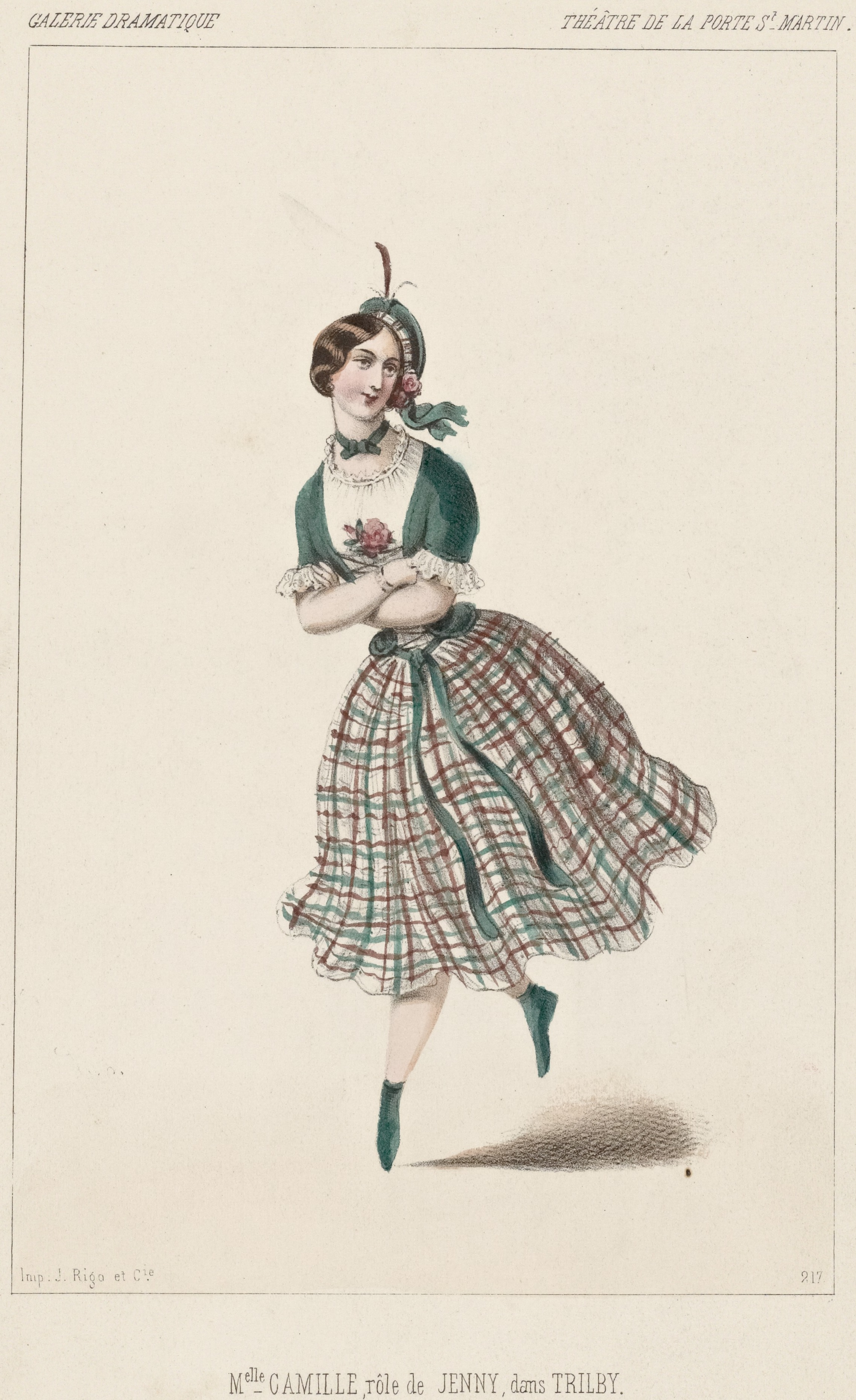
Trilby and Jenny in Ragaine's Trilby ballet, 1846

Several ballets and an opera have been based on Trilby, with varying degrees of faithfulness.

La Sylphide, written by French tenor Adolphe Nourrit, and choreographed by Italian choreographer Filippo Taglioni, premiered 12 March 1832 at the Paris Opera, and is considered the first Romantic ballet. It reversed the gender of the main roles and changed the supporting characters. James, a young male Scottish farmer, is engaged to Effie, but is enticed by the Sylphide, a female sylph. The evil witch Madge convinces him to give the Sylphide a magic shawl, which makes her lose her wings and die, while Effie marries a rival suitor, Gurn. Marie Taglioni, the choreographer's daughter, who danced the Sylphide, was the first to dance a full-length ballet en pointe, and became one of the first international ballet stars. It was performed in London and Berlin in 1832, New York and St Petersburg in 1835, and Vienna in 1836, but then ceased performances. Danish choreographer August Bournonville adapted La Sylphide for the Royal Danish Ballet in 1836, and his version has been a part of that ballet's repertoire since.

Nourrit's La Sylphide was in turn adapted as the opera The Mountain Sylph, by English composer John Barnett and librettist Thomas James Thackeray in 1834. It was staged in cities throughout England, Scotland, and Ireland through 1906, as well as Sydney, Australia 1846-49. The plot of Trilby is almost unrecognizable: it starts similarly to La Sylphide, but continues to a happy ending. Eolia, the Mountain Sylph, falls in love with Donald, a Scottish peasant, and he with her. However, Donald is engaged to Jessie, who is loved by Donald's friend and rival Christie. Christie summons the Wizard Hela, enemy of the sylphs, who gives Donald a cursed scarf. When Donald puts the scarf on Eolia, she loses her wings, and is carried off by the fiend Astaroth. Etheria the Sylthid Queen gives Donald a magic rose to make him and Christie invisible, the two rescue Eolia, and Donald marries her while Christie marries Jessie.

Another ballet based on the book was Trilby, by Jean Ragaine, performed in 1846 at the Théâtre de la Porte Saint-Martin in Paris. Yet another ballet, also named Trilby, was written and choreographed by French ballet master Marius Petipa, and premiered in 1870 in Moscow. In it, the elf Trilby protects the home of the young woman Bettli while sworn to love the little bird Colibri. However he falls in love with Bettli, who is engaged to peasant Wilhelm. Trilby cages Colibri, enchants Bettli, and transports her to the Land of Elves. When Wilhelm releases Colibri from her cage, the magic is undone, Trilby dies, and Bettli is released to marry Wilhelm.

== Translations ==
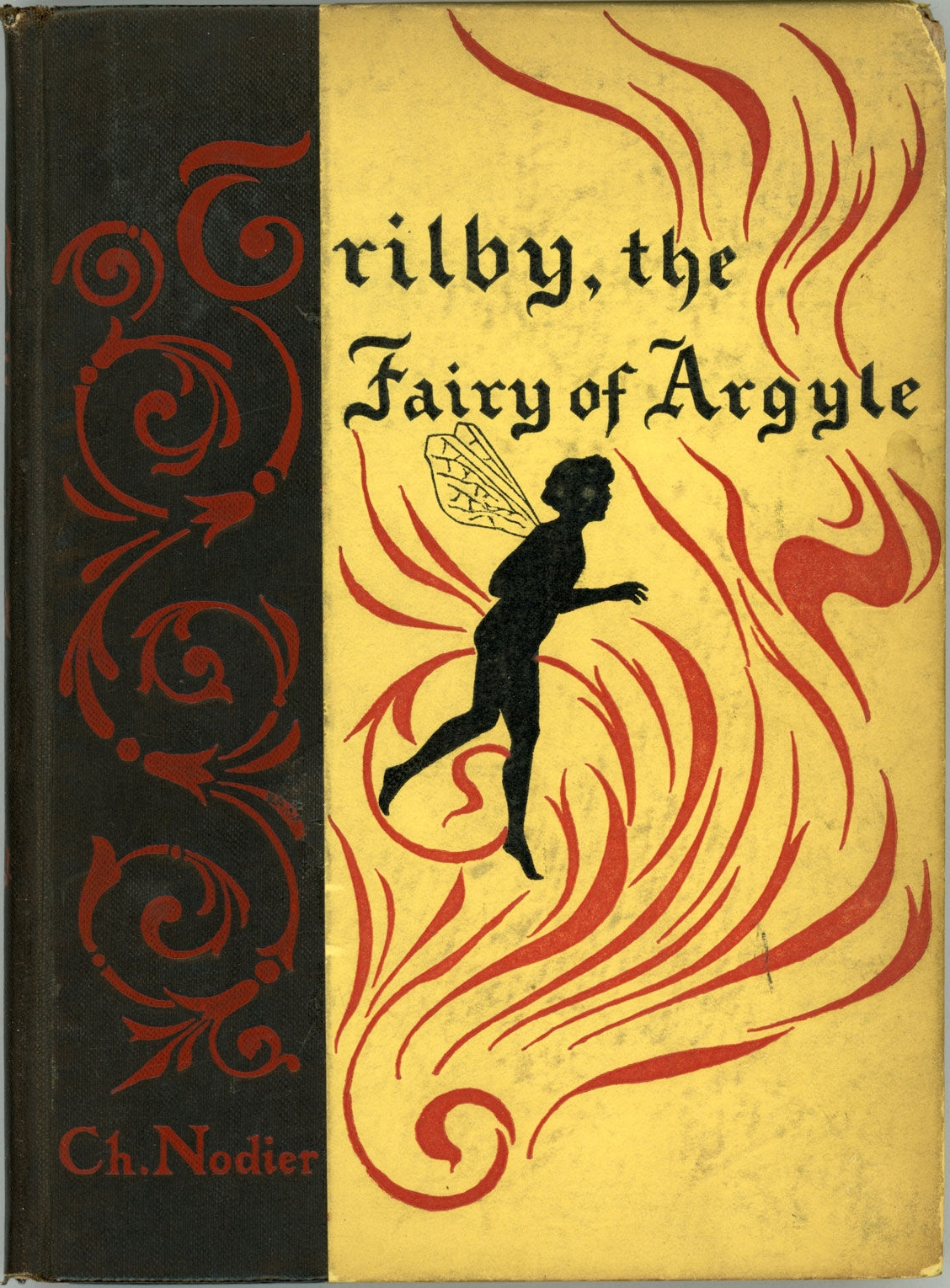
Cover of the Dole translation

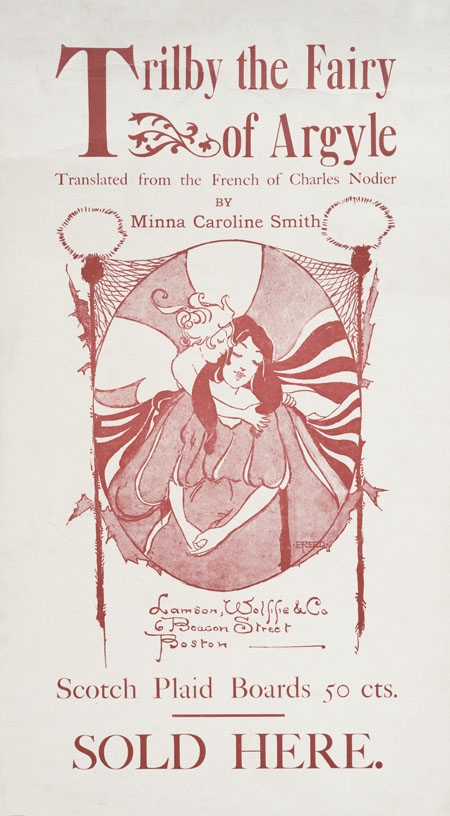
Poster advertising the Smith translation

The competing 1895 Boston English translations

A Spanish language translation, Trilby, ó, El duende de Argail, or simply Trilby, was put out by Juan Oliveres in 1842.

The first English language translations of Trilby were due to the success of the mostly unrelated 1894 novel Trilby, by George du Maurier, which was one of the most popular novels of its time, selling an unprecedented hundred thousand copies in four months, and causing an enthusiastic reaction called "Trilbymania". Literary critics believed the title of the novel to come from Nodier's Trilby of 1822, and found similarities in the unconventional and lively personality of the heroine, du Maurier's Trilby, to the magical charm of Nodier's story. So when American editor and writer Nathan Haskell Dole wrote the first translation, Trilby, the Fairy of Argyle (1895, Boston: Estes and Lauriat), in a clear attempt to benefit from the du Maurier book's popularity, he spent most of the introduction discussing the du Maurier book and heroine. Another translation from the same time and place, Trilby the Fairy of Argyle, by Minna Caroline Smith (also 1895, Boston: Lamson, Wolffe), does not explicitly mention the du Maurier book but was put out in competition with the Dole translation, and published days later.

More recent English language translations include the two-story collections Smarra & Trilby by Judith Landry (1993, Dedalus Books), and Trilby / The Crumb Fairy, by Ruth Berman (2015, Black Coat Press).

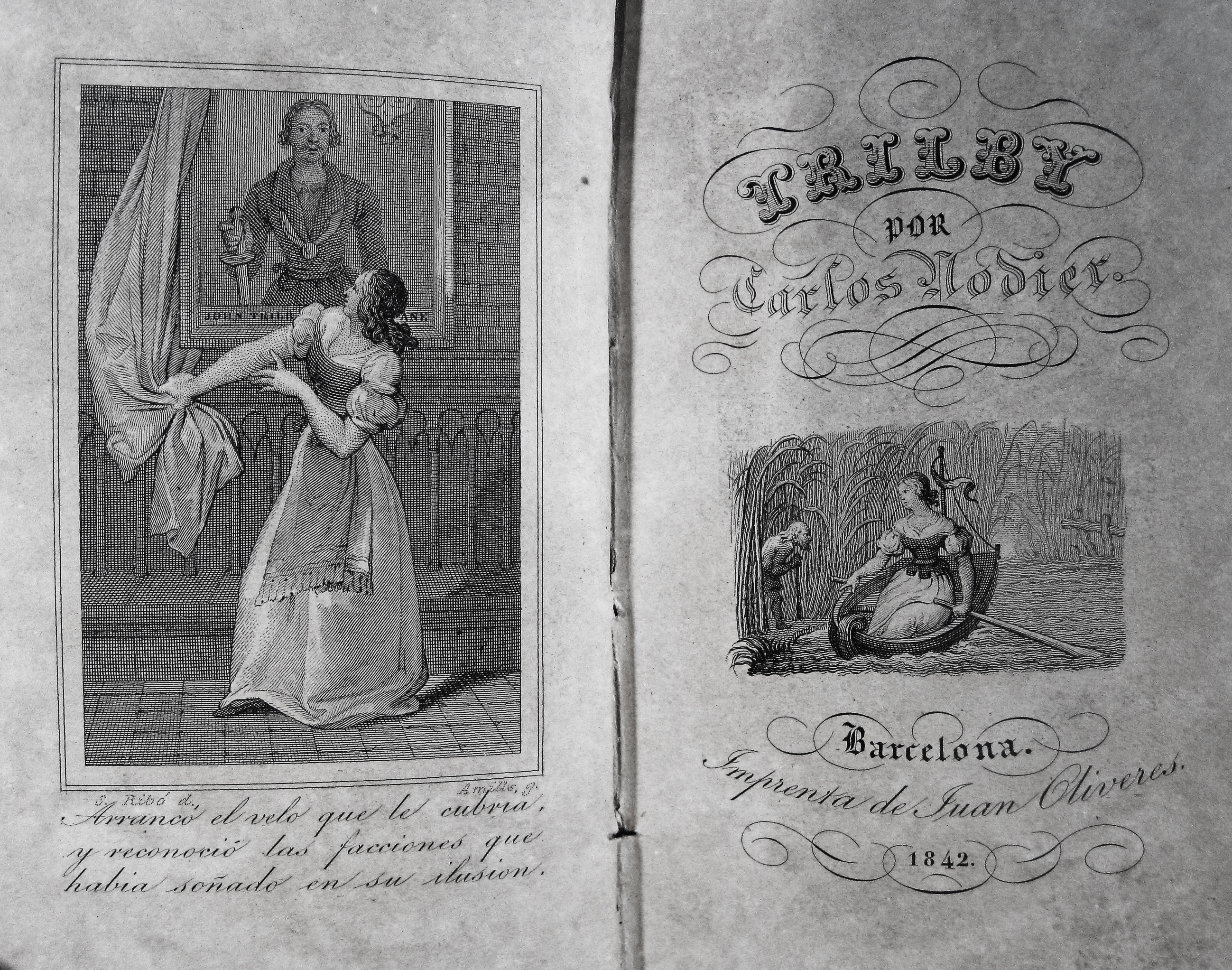
Front pages of Trilby, Spanish, 1842
