= Trilby (ballet) =

1870 ballet by Marius Petipa

Trilby is a ballet in 2 acts and 3 scenes. It was the final ballet that Marius Petipa choreographed and staged for the Imperial Bolshoi Ballet during the two years he was commissioned to create new works for the Moscow stage. And the music was by Yuli Gerber. Libretto by Marius Petipa, based on the 1822 novella Trilby, ou Le Lutin d'Argail by Charles Nodier. The ballet was first presented by the Ballet of the Moscow Imperial Bolshoi Theatre on January 25/February 6 (Julian/Gregorian calendar dates), 1870, in Moscow with Polina Karpakova as Trilby and Ludiia Geiten as Miranda. It was later restaged by Petipa for the Imperial Ballet at the Imperial Bolshoi Kamenny Theatre on January 17–29, 1871 in St. Petersburg with Adèle Grantzow as Trilby and Lev Ivanov as Count Leopold. Petipa made a more direct adaptation of Nodier’s novella.

The famous variation for the male dancer in the Le Corsaire pas de deux is from Gerber's score for Trilby; a painting of dancers from the ballet in costume (as fledglings emerging from the shell) by Viktor Hartmann was one of the paintings which inspired Pictures at an Exhibition by Mussorgsky.
