= Casimir Dudevant =

Husband of George Sand

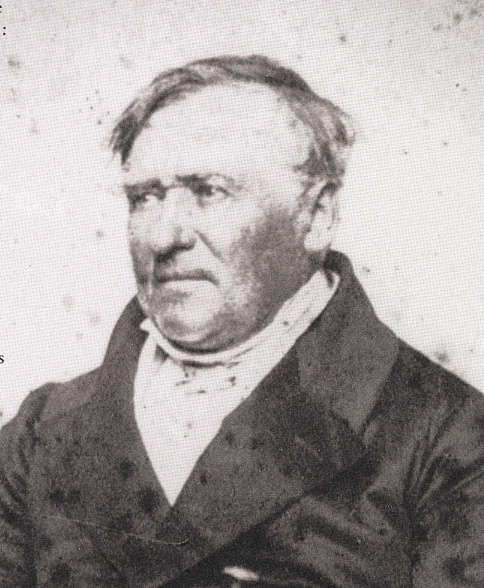
Dudevant in the 1860s

François Casimir Dudevant (6 July 1795 – 8 March 1871) was the illegitimate son of Baron Jean-François Dudevant (1754–1826), a French military officer, and his mistress Augustine Soulé.

On 10 December 1822, Dudevant married Aurore Dupin, who became well known as an author using the name George Sand. Before separating in 1830, they had two children: Maurice (1823–1889) and Solange (1828–1899), who married the artist Auguste Clésinger in 1847.

Dudevant was born in Guillery and died in Barbaste.
