= Lucile Messageot =

French painter and poet (1780–1803)

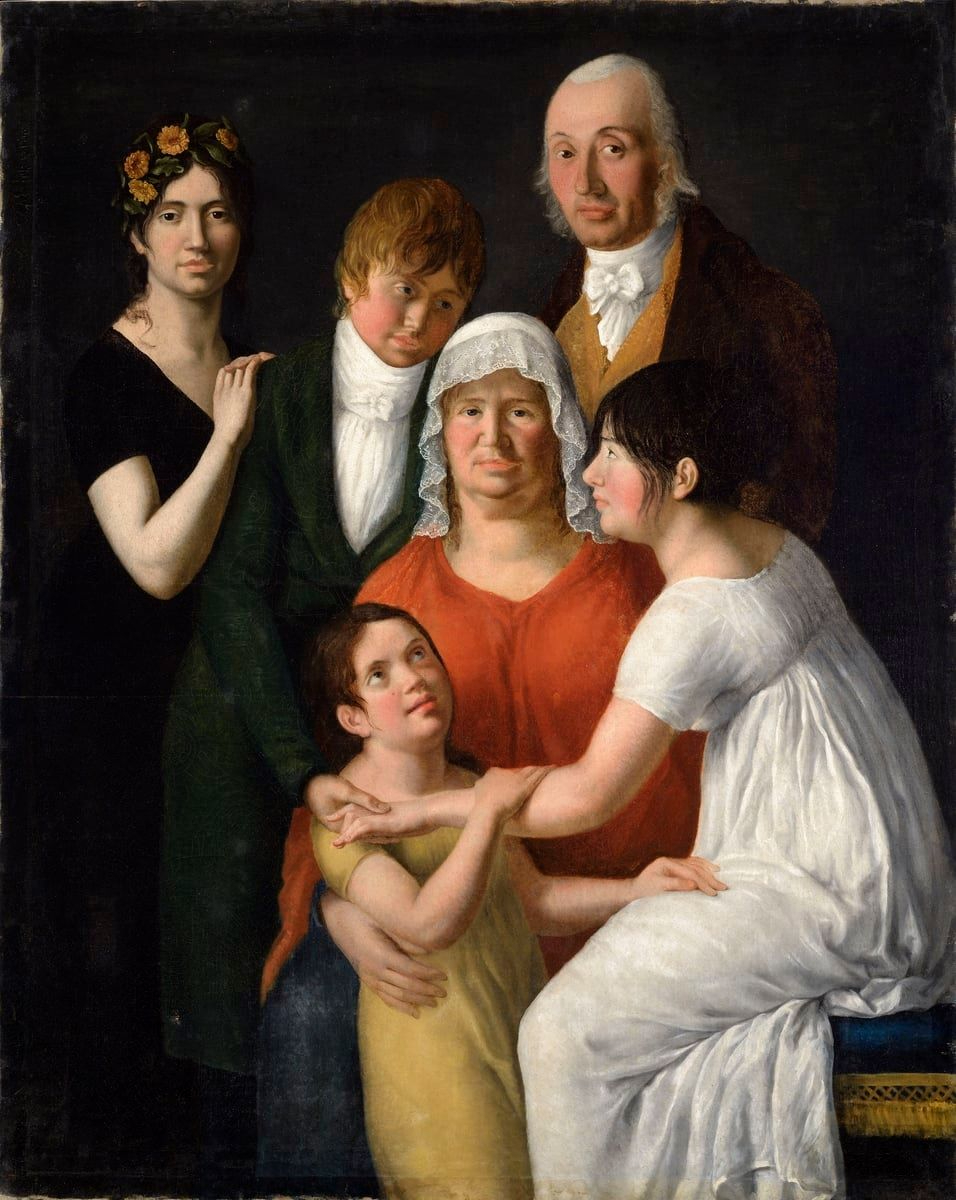
The Messageot-Charve Family (Lucile is standing, on the left, with her younger brother, Xavier. The woman in the middle is her mother, and the figure behind is her father-in-law, Claude-Antoine Charve, a judge. The woman in white is her sister Fanny, with her half-sister Désirée, who would marry the author, Charles Nodier)

Marguerite Françoise Lucie Messageot, or Lucile Franque (French: [lysil mesaʒo]; 13 September 1780, Lons-le-Saunier - 23 May 1803, place unknown) was a French painter and author.

== Biography ==
She was born to Jean-Joseph Messageot, a cavalry officer, and his wife Marie Françoise, née Clerc. Her sister Fanny was a novelist. While still very young, she began her studies with Pierre-Narcisse Guérin in Paris. Her first exhibit came in 1799, but ended poorly when her portrait of Anne-Louise-Francoise Delorme (1756-1825), who called herself "Princess" Stéphanie-Louise de Bourbon-Conti, was deemed politically subversive and removed from the exhibition.

For her second exhibition in 1802, she chose a subject taken from the poems of Ossian. This was inspired by her membership in a group known as the Secte de Barbus, or the "Primitives".

The group was created by Pierre-Maurice Quays, a student of Jacques-Louis David, and advocated a return to earlier, simpler artistic styles. In 1798, Jean-Pierre Franque was expelled from David's studio for his activities with the group, and he settled in with her in Chaillot. In 1800, they were joined by his brother Joseph, who had also been banned from the studio. Well-known figures from the world of arts and letters came to visit them, and she served as their muse.

In 1799, she and Jean-Pierre had a daughter, named Isis. They were married in January 1802, and she died of tuberculosis the following year.

She is the author of fragments of an Essay on the harmonies of melancholy and the arts, and of a poem, Le Tombeau d'Éléonore. A group portrait of her family is her only work in a public collection: the Museum of Fine Arts of Lyon.
