= Fanny Tercy =

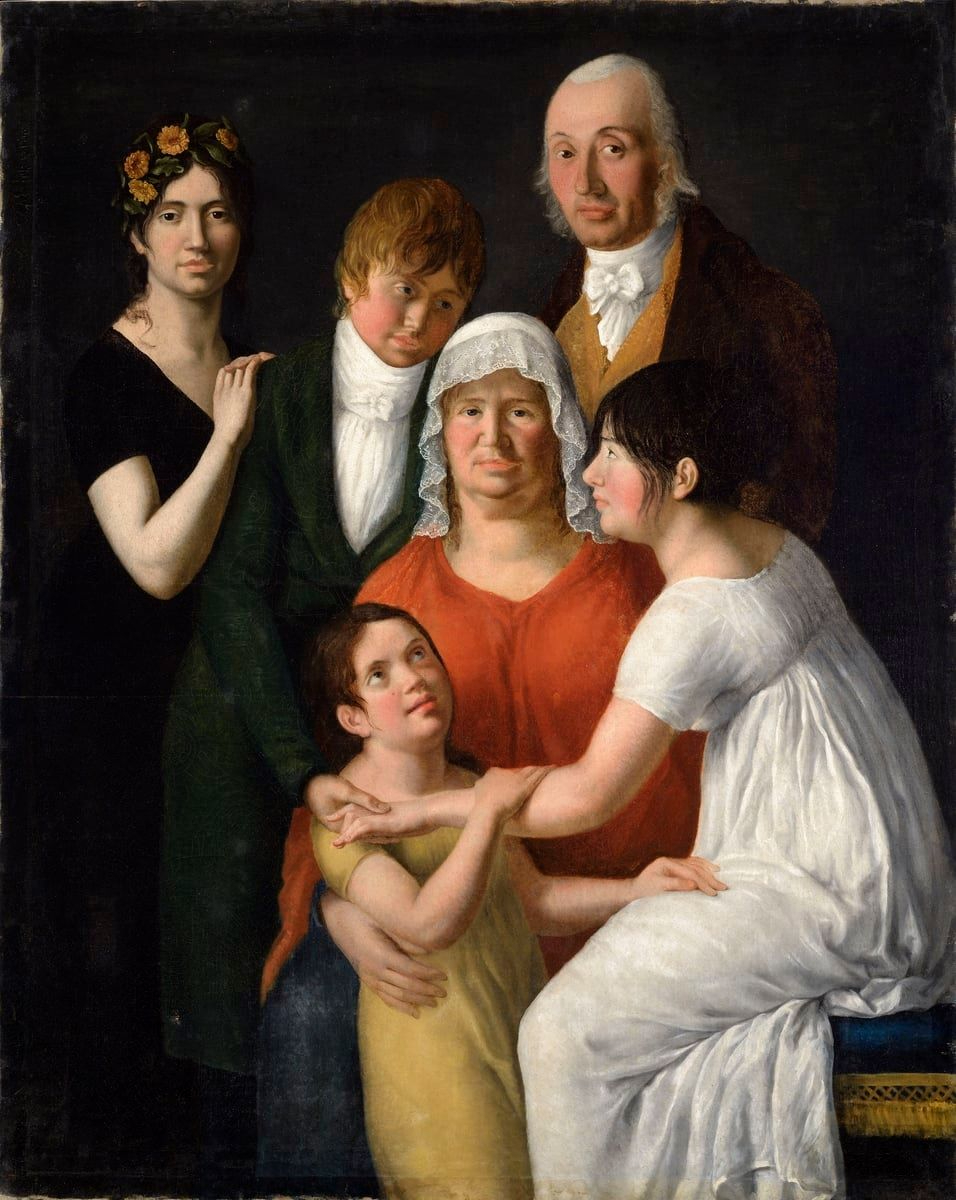
- In this painting, the artist, Lucile Messageot (top left, dressed in black) depicted herself with her mother Marie Françoise Clerc (1749-1825) (center, dressed in orange), and her second husband, Judge Claude Antoine Charve (standing, top right), her brother and sister from the first marriage, Xavier Messageot (1782-1844) (top center), and Fanny (bottom right, dressed in white). Bottom center, dressed in yellow, is the young Liberté, future wife of Charles Nodier.
- Born: Françoise-Cécile Messageot; 22 November 1782 Lons-le-Saunier, Franche-Comté, France
- Died: 1 April 1851 (aged 68) Quintigny, Jura, France
- Occupation: Novelist
- Period: Early 19th-century
- Genre: Historical novels
- Literary movement: Sentimentalism
- Spouse: Anne-François Tercy (m. 1814; sep. 1824)
- Relatives: Lucile Messageot (sister); Marie Mennessier-Nodier (niece); Charles Nodier (brother-in-law)

Fanny Tercy, née Françoise-Cécile Messageot (22 November 1782, Lons-le-Saunier – 1 April 1851, Quintigny), was a 19th-century French historical novelist. Along with Stéphanie Félicité, comtesse de Genlis, Gabrielle de Paban, Sophie Doin, and George Sand, Tercy embraced and transformed sentimentalism during the first half of the 19th century.

== Biography ==
Françoise-Cécile (nickname "Fanny") Messageot, was born on 22 November 1782 in Lons-le-Saunier. She was the daughter of Jean Joseph Messageot, a cavalry officer who became a postmaster, and Marie-Françoise Clerc. She had an older sister, Lucile, who became a painter, and a twin brother, François-Xavier. Her mother remarried Claude-Antoine Charve, a judge at the Lons-le-Saunier court. From this second marriage, Louis, Tercy's half-brother, and Liberté-Constitution-Désirée (1790–1856), a half-sister who married Charles Nodier, were born. Tercy spent her childhood in Lons-le-Saunier.

Judge Charve was imprisoned in 1793 at the Cordeliers prison where he met Anne-François Tercy (1775–1841), playwright and "man of letters", also imprisoned; he was Fanny's future husband. They married on 11 September 1814. After the wedding, the couple went to Paris and were very close to Charles Nodier. He encouraged Fanny Tercy to write. Unable to stand her husband any longer, she left him in 1824. To prepare for her La Dame d'Oliferne (1829), Tercy walked from the town of Arinthod to the old Oliferne castle. She regularly attended the salon held by Charles Nodier and met many writers of the time there: "... Fanny de Tercy, in her corner, had already finished her work: she would not stop knitting while Musset, Hugo, Vigny or Nerval were recounting their verses".

== Later life and death ==
During the reign of Louis-Philippe, she obtained a pension of a "woman of letters". From 1839, Fanny Tercy returned to Quintigny, where she died on 1 April 1851.

== Selected works ==
- Deux nouvelles françaises : Marie Bolden, ou la Folle de Cayeux et Cécile de Renneville , Paris, Th. Desoer, 1816
- Louise de Sénancourt Paris, Maradan, 1817 (Note: The name of the author is only very partially indicated; "Mme de T." author of Cécile de Renneville and Marie Bolden". Éric Paquin makes an analysis of this incomplete indication in his thesis of letters, from 1998, The feminine epistolary narrative at the turn of the Enlightenment and at the beginning of the 19th century (1793-1837): adaptation and renewal of a narrative form.".)
- Isaure et Montigny, Paris, 1818
- Six nouvelles, 2 vol., Paris, Galliot, 1821
- L’Ermite du mont Saint-Valentin, ou Histoire des amours de la dame de Martigues et du chevalier Roger de Parthenay, 2 vol. Paris, Béchet aîné, 1821
- Contes moraux à l'usage des enfants, Gallica, 1828
- La Dame d'Oliferne, Paris, Levavasseur, 1829
- Chroniques franc-comtoises. La Tour de Dramelay, Paris, C. Vimont, 1831
- Nouvelles chroniques francomtoises. Le Juif et la sorcière. Paris, C. Vimont, 1833
- Historiettes et conversations morales, dédiées à Mennessier Nodier, Paris, Dufey, 1834
- Chalain et les enfants de M. Aubert, 1834
- Emmerande la bienheureuse, 1834
- Pierre et Marcellin, 1836
