= Jean-Pierre Franque =

French painter (1774–1860)

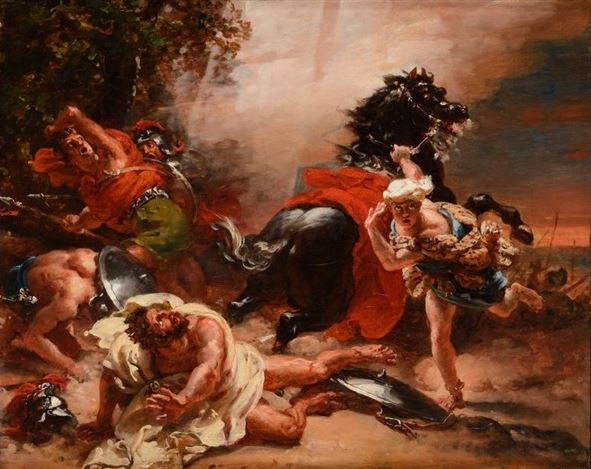
The Conversion of Saint Paul

Jean-Pierre Franque, born Francou (11 August 1774, Buis-les-Baronnies – 28 March 1860, Quintigny) was a French painter of portraits, historical events and mythological scenes.

== Biography ==
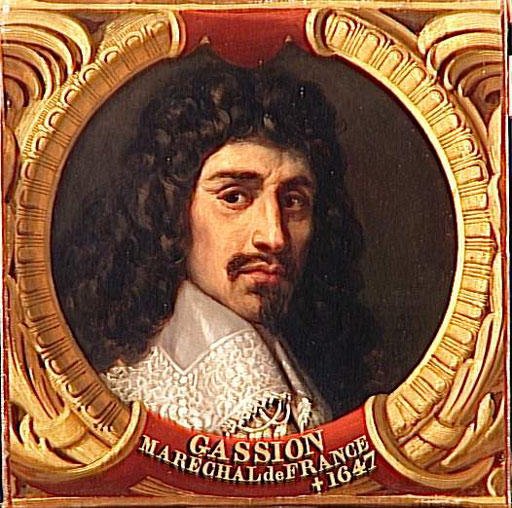
Jean, Comte de Gassion, from Personalities...

Born to a humble family, he and his twin brother Joseph began as shepherds. Their artistic talents were noticed and encouraged by a local noblewoman so, in 1786, at the age of twelve, they were sent to Grenoble for their first lessons.

Later, they went to Paris together. There, in 1792, the National Convention awarded them financial assistance to continue their studies. In 1794, they became students of Jacques-Louis David. Jean-Pierre worked as his assistant and lived at the studio. Both brothers came under the influence of the Secte de Barbus, led by Pierre-Maurice Quays. The group's meetings, held in Jean-Pierre's room, led David to dismiss him.

In 1802, he married the painter Lucile Messageot, another member of the group and the mother of his daughter, born in 1799 out of wedlock. The marriage lasted only a year before she died of tuberculosis.

Quays also died in 1803, so he set out to pursue a career on his own. He and Joseph had their debuts at the Salon of 1806. That same year, he created some decorations for the Élysée Palace. His most successful exhibit at the Salon came in 1812, with a depiction of the Second Battle of Zurich, commissioned by Marshal André Masséna.

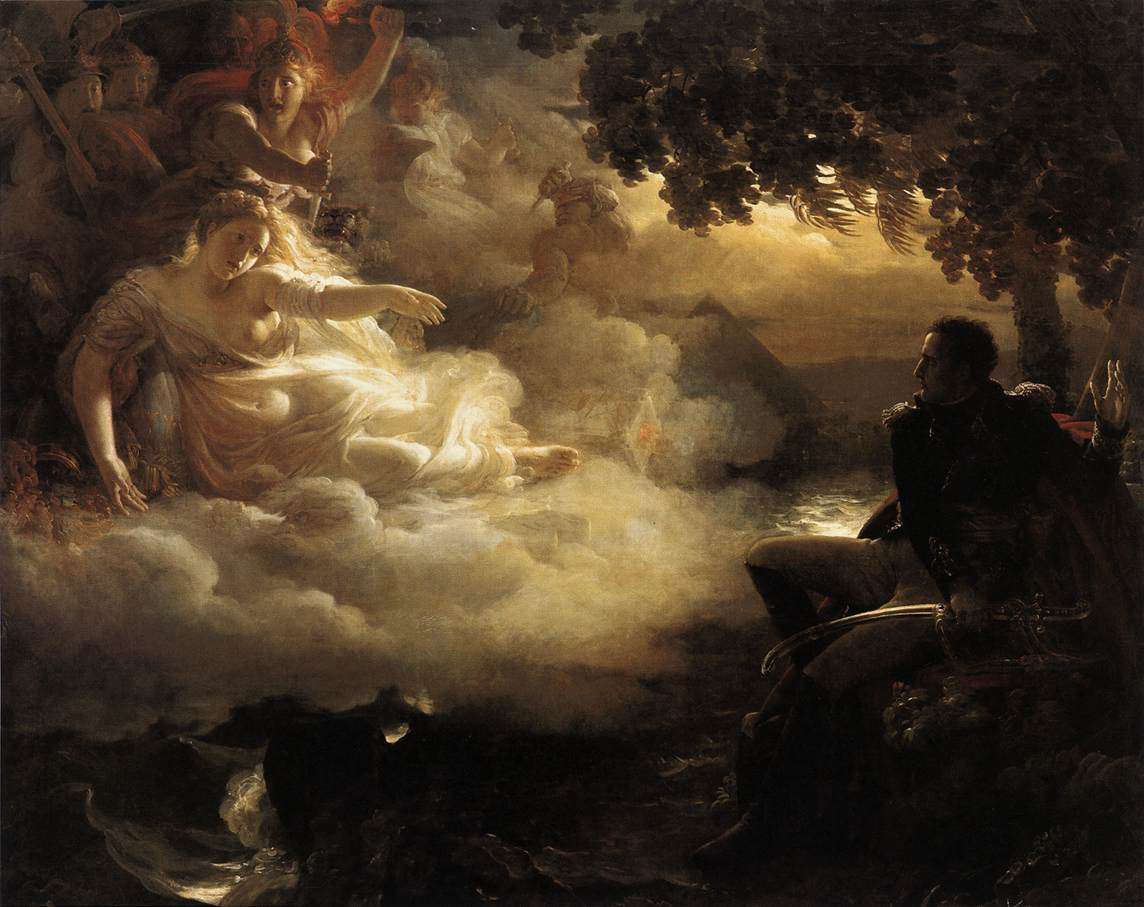
Allegory of France Before the Return of Napoleon from Egypt, 1810, now in the Louvre

In the years that followed, he painted a series of works on mythological and biblical subjects, including a Conversion of Saint Paul (1819), which was reproduced at the Gobelins Manufactory. The latter part of his life was devoted almost entirely to portraiture, notably a series called Personalities from the reign of Louis XIII and Louis XIV, currently at the Palace of Versailles. His last exhibit at the Salon was in 1853.
