= List of compositions by Johann Nepomuk Hummel =

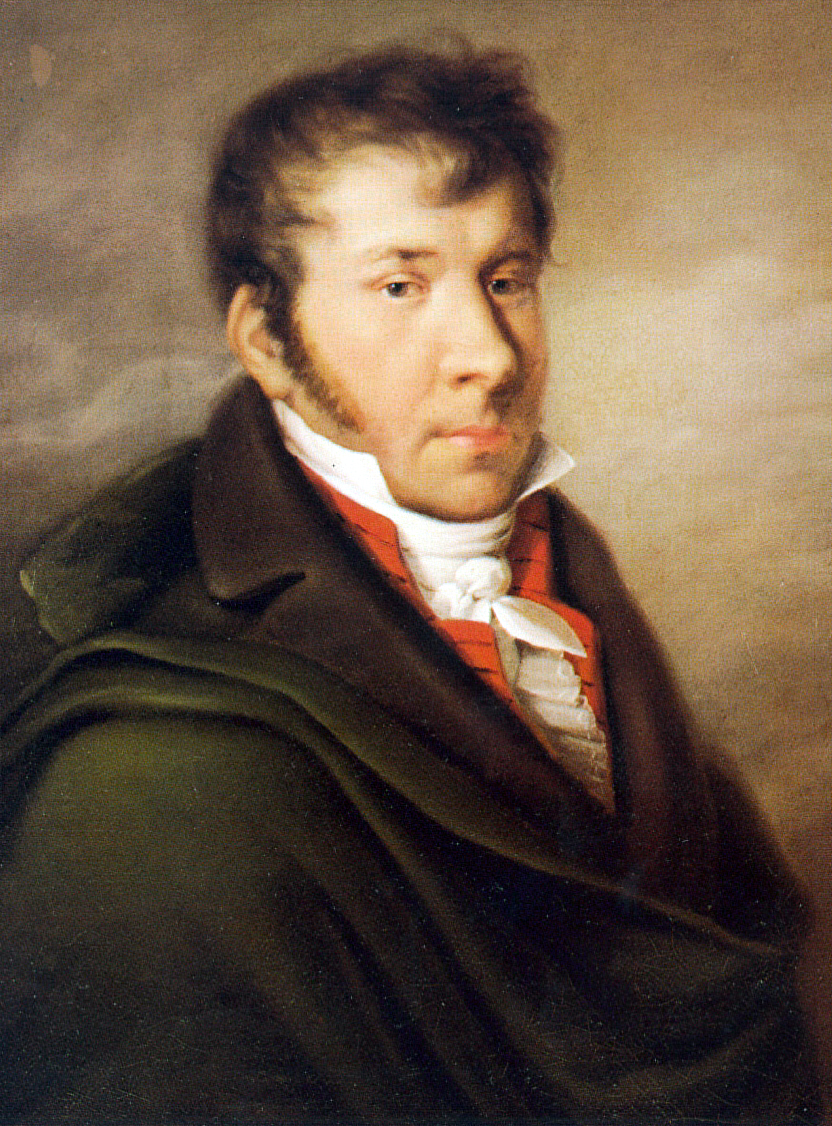
Johann Nepomuk Hummel

This is a list of compositions by Johann Nepomuk Hummel.

== By opus numbers ==
This list is sorted by opus number.

- Op. 1, 3 sets of Variations for piano (London, 1791)
  1. The Plough Boy in C major
  2. Bluhe Liebes Veilhen in G major
  3. La Belle Catherine in C major
- Op. 2, 2 sets of Variations for piano (London, 1791)
  1. The Lass of Richmond Hill in G major
  2. Jem of Aberdeen in G major
- Op. 2a, 3 Sonatas (London, 1792)
  1. For Violin (or Flute), Violoncello, and Piano in B♭ major
  2. For Violin (or Flute) and Piano in G major
  3. For Piano, No. 1, in C major
- Op. 3, 3 sets of Variations for piano (London, 1794)
  1. A Rondo of Pleyel in C major
  2. The Lass of Richmond Hill in G major (Opus 2–1)
  3. Wenn's Immer So War in G major
- Op. 3a, Trio for Violin, Violoncello, and Piano, No. 1, in B♭ major (1792). Not described as a trio by the composer, and not included in otherwise complete sets.
- Op. 4, 3 Cadenzas for Piano Concertos by Mozart (1790s)
  1. for K 413
  2. for K 414
  3. for K 415
- Op. 5, 3 Sonatas (Vienna, circa 1798)
  1. For Violin in B♭ major
  2. For Violin in F major
  3. For Viola in E♭ major
- Op. 6, Variations for Piano and Orchestra (Vienna, circa 1798). Theme by Foglar (F major)
- Op. 7, 3 Fugues on the Style of Handel (Vienna, circa 1799)
  1. Fugue in D minor
  2. Fugue in E♭ major
  3. Fugue in F♯ minor
- Op. 8, Variations for Piano on a Traditional Austrian Song in F major (Vienna, circa 1801)
- Op. 9, Variations for Piano on a March by Cherubini in E major (Vienna, circa 1802)
- Op. 10, Variations for Piano on "God Save The King" in D major (Vienna, circa 1804)
- Op. 11, Rondo Favori for Piano in E♭ major (Vienna, circa 1804)
- Op. 12, Trio for Violin, Violoncello, and Piano, No. 2, in E♭ major (Vienna, circa 1803)
- Op. 13, Sonata for Piano, No. 2 in E♭ major (Vienna, circa 1803–1805)
- Op. 14, Variations for Flute and Piano in G major (Vienna, circa 1803). Theme by Meyule
- Op. 15, Variations for Piano on an Aria from Dalayrac's "Les Deux Petits Savoyards" in A minor (Vienna, circa 1804)
- Op. 16, 6 German Dances (1804). For orchestra. Also for piano (Vienna, circa 1804)
- Op. 17, Concerto for Violin and Piano in G major (Vienna, circa 1805)
- Op. 17a, Cadenza to Mozart's Piano Concerto, K 595
- Op. 18, Fantasy for Piano in E♭ major (Vienna, circa 1805)
- Op. 19, Rondo-Fantasy for Piano in E major (Vienna, circa 1806)
- Op. 20, Sonata for Piano, No. 3 in F minor (Vienna, circa 1807)
- Op. 21, Variations for Piano on a Dutch Song in B♭ major (Vienna, circa 1806)
- Op. 22, Trio for Violin, Violoncello, and Piano, No. 3 in F major (Vienna, circa 1799–1807)
- Op. 23, 7 Hungarian Dances (1806). For orchestra. Also for piano (Vienna, circa 1806)
- Op. 24, 12 Minuets (1806). For orchestra. Also for piano (Vienna, circa 1807)
- Op. 25, 12 German Dances and Coda (1807) For orchestra. Also for piano (Vienna, circa 1807)
- Op. 26, Ballet, Helene And Paris (1807)
- Op. 27, Dance for Apollosaal, No. 1 (1808). 12 minuets for orchestra. Also for chamber ensemble (Vienna, circa 1808)
- Op. 28, Dance for Apollosaal, No. 2 (1808). 12 German dances for orchestra. Also for piano (Vienna, circa 1808)
- Op. 29, 12 German Dances for Redout-Deutsche (1808). For orchestra. Also for chamber ensemble (Vienna, circa 1808)
- Op. 30, 3 String Quartets (Vienna, circa 1804–1808)
  1. No. 1 in C major
  2. No. 2 in G major
  3. No. 3 in E♭ major
- Op. 31, Dance for Apollosaal, No. 3 (1809). 6 waltzes for orchestra. Also for piano (Vienna, circa 1810)
- Op. 32, Variations for Piano On "La Sentinelle" (1812)
- Op. 33, Ballet, Das belebte Gemählde (1809). Also for piano (Vienna, circa 1810)
- Op. 34, 3 Sets of Variations for Piano (Vienna, circa 1810–1812)
  1. La Sentinelle in C major
  2. Partant Bacchus La Syrie in D major
  3. Mozart's Opera in C major
- Op. 35, Trio for Violin, Violoncello, and Piano, No. 4 in G major (Vienna, circa 1808–1811)
- Op. 36, Concerto for Piano, No. 1 in C major (Vienna, circa 1811). Also known as Op. 34a
- Op. 37, 8 Pieces for Piano: "Choix Des Plus Beaux Morceaux De Musique" (Vienna, circa 1811)
- Op. 37a, Sonata for Mandolin and Piano in C major (Vienna, circa 1810). Also for violin and piano.
- Op. 38, Sonata for Piano, No. 4 in C major (Vienna, circa 1808)
- Op. 39, Dance for Apollosaal, No. 4 (1811). 4 German dances and coda for orchestra. Also for piano (Vienna, circa 1811)
- Op. 40, 12 German Dances for a Roman Emperor (1811). For orchestra. Also for chamber ensemble (Vienna, circa 1811)
- Op. 40a, Variations for Piano on a March from Isouard's "Cendrillon" in C major (Vienna, circa 1811–1812)
- Op. 41, Ballet, Quintuor Des Negares Du Ballet Paul Et Virginie (1809). Also for piano (Vienna, circa 1810)
- Op. 43, Overture to the opera Jovan of Finland in D minor (circa 1811). For orchestra. Also for two pianos (Vienna, circa 1812)
- Op. 46, Pantomime, Der Zauberring (1811)
- Op. 50, Sonata for Flute and Piano in D major
- Op. 51, Sonata for Piano 4-Hands in E♭
- Op. 53, Potpourris for Piano and Guitar
- Op. 54, Variations a la Monferina for the Piano Forte and Violoncello (c.1815)
- Op. 55, La Bella Capricciosa, Polacca for Clavicembalo
- Op. 56, Rondo Brilliant for Piano and Orchestra, in A
- Op. 57, Variations for Piano in F major on a theme from Gluck's Armide (1815)
- Op. 63, Grande Sérénade ... pour le Piano, Violon, Guitare, Clarinette et Basson ou Flûte et Violoncelle
- Op. 64, Sonata for Flute and Piano
- Op. 65, Trio for Violin, Violoncello, and Piano No. 5 in G major (ca. 1815)
- Op. 66, Grande Serenade ... pour le Piano, Violon, Guitare, Clarinette et Basson ou Flûte et Violoncelle.
- Op. 67, 24 Preludes in all major and minor keys for Piano (1815)
- Op. 68, Ballet, Sappho von Mitilene (1812)
- Op. 69, Singspiel, Die Rückfahrt des Kaisers (1814)
- Op. 71, La sentinelle (1815), for tenor solo, men's chorus (TTB), guitar and double bass
- Op. 73, Piano Concertino G major
- Op. 74, Septet for Piano, Winds and Strings in D minor
- Op. 75, Adagio, Variations and Rondo, to the favorite song "Pretty Polly", for the piano forte.
- Op. 77, Mass in B♭ major.
- Op. 78, Trio for Piano, Flute, and Violoncello (also published as Adagio, Variations and Rondo) in A major.
- Op. 80, Mass No. 2 for Four Soloists, Mixed Chorus, Orchestra and Organ in E♭ Major.
- Op. 81, Piano Sonata No. 5 in F♯ minor
- Op. 83, Trio for Violin, Violoncello, and Piano No. 6 in E major
- Op. 84, Lieder "An die Entfernte"
- Op. 85, Concerto for Piano No. 2 in A minor
- Op. 87, Quintet for Piano, Violin, Viola, Cello and Bass in E♭ minor
- Op. 89, Concerto for Piano No. 3 in B minor
- Op. 89a, Alma Virgo, Offertorium for Soprano, Chorus and Orchestra
- Op. 91 Waltzes for Piano
- Op. 92, Sonata for Piano 4-Hands in A♭ major
- Op. 93, Trio for Violin, Violoncello, and Piano No. 7 in E♭ major.
- Op. 94, Potpourri for Viola and Orchestra on "Il mio tesoro"
- Op. 96, Trio for Violin, Violoncello, and Piano No. 8 in E♭ major
- Op. 97, Variations in F major for piano and orchestra
- Op. 98, Introduction et rondo brillant for piano and orchestra
- Op. 99, Nocturne for small ensemble in F major
- Op. 100, Opera, Mathilde von Guise (1810 rev. 1827)
- Op. 101, Overture for Orchestra No. 1 in B♭ major
- Op. 102, Introduction and Variations for Oboe or Flute, with the Accompaniment of Piano or Orchestra in F major
- Op. 104, Sonata for Piano and Violoncello in A major
- Op. 105, Trois amusements en forme de caprices for Piano
- Op. 106, Piano Sonata No. 6 in D major
- Op. 110, Concerto for Piano and Orchestra No. 4 in E major
- Op. 111, Mass No. 3 for Soloists, Chorus, and Orchestra in D major
- Op. 113, Concerto for Piano and Orchestra No. 5 in A♭ major.
- Op. 114, Septet Militaire in C major
- Op. 115, Variations for Piano and Orchestra in B♭ major on a theme from Das Fest der Handwerker.
- Op. 116, Oberons Zauberhorn for piano and orchestra
- Op. 117, Gesellschafts-Rondo (Society Rondo)
- Op. 118, Air à la tirolienne avec variations
- Op. 119, Les Charmes de Londres Three Themes Varied for the Piano
- Op. 120, Rondo for Piano "La galante" in E♭ (also published as Op. 121)
- Op. 122, Rondo Villageois
- Op. 123, Fantasie for Piano on themes by Hummel and Sigismond Neukomm
- Op. 124, Fantasia on themes from "Le nozze di Figaro"
- Op. 125, Études for Piano (24)
- Op. 126, Rondo Brilliant for Violin and Piano in G major
- Op. 127, "Le Retour à Londres", Rondo Brilliant for Piano and Orchestra in F major
- Op. 127, (also?) Grand Posthumous Concerto for Piano And Orchestra in F major (published in London in 1853)
- Op. post. 1 – Piano Concerto in F major
- Op. post. 2 – Variations for Violin and Piano in F major
- Op. post. 3 – Scotch Country Dance and Rondo for Piano in G major
- Op. post. 4, WoO 6 – Piano Quartet in G major
- Op. post. 5 – Rondo for Two Pianos in E♭ major
- Op. post. 6 – Capriccio for Piano in E♭ minor
- Op. post. 7 – Two Preludes and Fugues for Organ in E♭ major
- Op. post. 8 – Ricercar for Piano in D major
- Op. post. 9 – Six Pieces for Piano (1839)
- WoO 15 – Tantum ergo after Gluck

== Sachs catalog ==
This list is of compositions not published during Hummel's lifetime, or published shortly thereafter and compiled by Joel Sachs. WoO numbers (Werke ohne Opus) refer to works included in Zimmerschmied's catalogue.

- S 1 – Variations for piano in A major
- S 2 – Variations for piano on "Malbrouck" in C major
- S 3 – Piano Quartet in D major
- S 4, WoO 24 – Piano Concerto in A major
- S 5 – Piano Concerto in A major
- S 6 – Schmauchlied
- S 7 – Die Sehnsucht
- S 8 – Per pietà bel idol mio
- S 9 – Placa gli sdegni tuoi
- S 10 – Italian Songs
- S 11 – Mentri dormi amor
- S 12 – Se lontan
- S 13 – Je gut gesinnter Freunde
- S 14 – Chantons l'ami
- S 15 – Peuple naguere
- S 16 – Variations for piano on "Peuplu acqueres" in B♭ major
- S 17 – Beneath the laurel's friendly shade
- S 18 – Variations for piano in D major
- S 19 – Variations for piano from Aline in C major
- S 20 – Variations for piano in C minor
- S 21 – Per te d'eterni allori
- S 22 – Figlio, le femmine son falsissime
- S 23 – Piano Sonata No.3 in F minor (original version)
- S 24 – Die eingebildeten Philosophen
- S 25, WoO 30 – Il viaggiator ridicolo (incomplete)
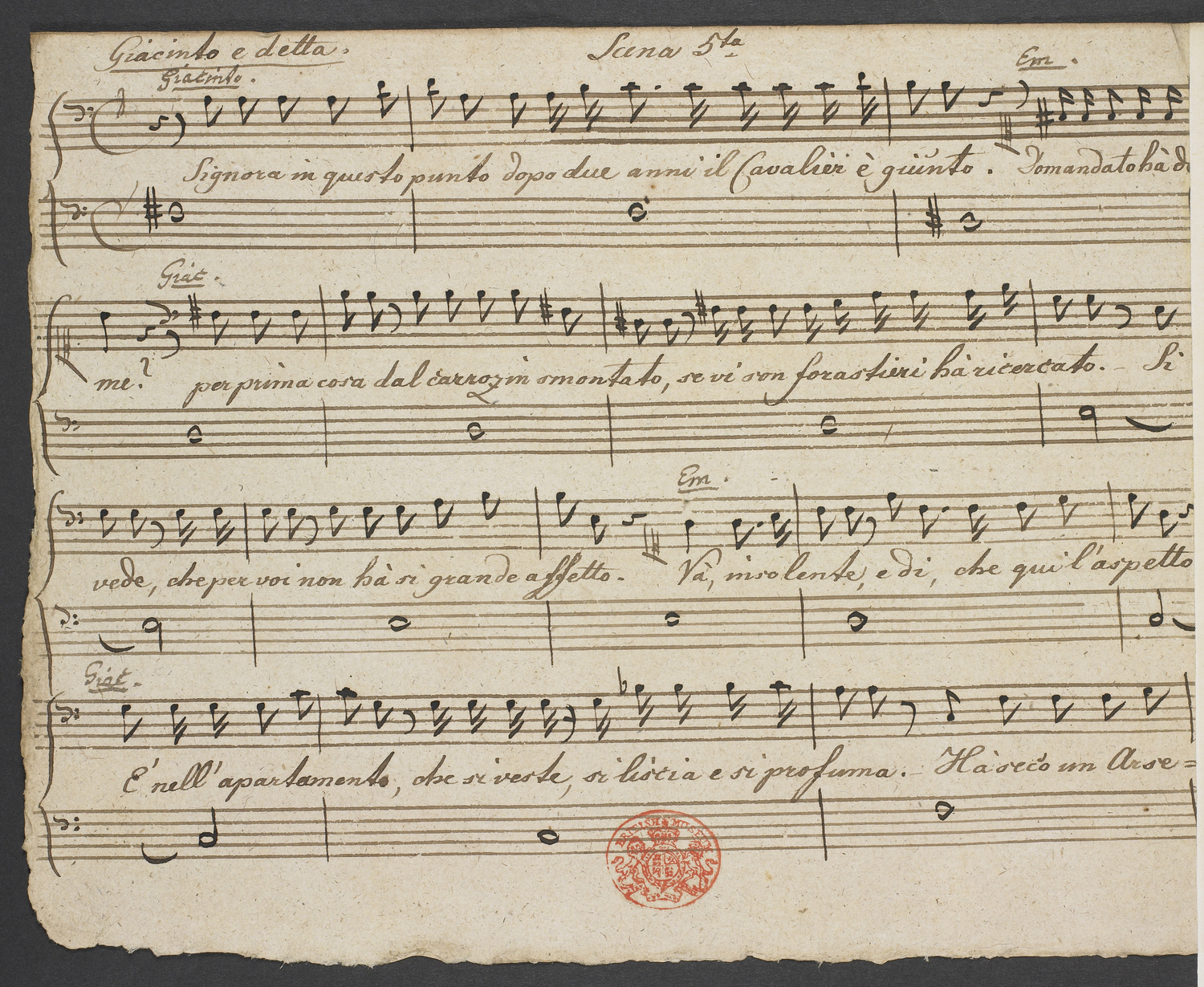
  Manuscript copy of Il viaggiator ridicolo
- S 26 – March for The citizen artilleryman party which should admire Vienna
- S 27 – Fantasia for piano in A♭ major
- S 28 – Mandolin Concerto in G major
- S 29 – Dankgefühl einer Geretteten
- S 30, WoO 3 – String Trio in E♭ major
- S 31 – Marpha
- S 32 – Irene
- S 33, WoO 11 – Der Durchzug durchs rote Meer
- S 34 – Tu me dis refrain
- S 35 – Toute la vie
- S 36 – Couplets d'accadie
- S 37 – L'amore
- S 38 – 2 Lieder
- S 39 – Piano piece in G major (incomplete)
- S 40 – 3 Pieces for Orfica
- S 41 – Demagorgon (incomplete)
- S 42 – Don Anchise Campione
- S 43 – Ich ward zu Wien
- S 44 – Der Whistspieler
- S 45 – Caro adorabile
- S 46, WoO 4 – String Trio in G major
- S 47, WoO 2 – Variations for orchestra on "O du lieber Augustin" in C major
- S 48 – Partita in E♭ major
- S 49, WoO 1 – Trumpet Concerto in E major
- S 50, WoO 14 – Dominus Deo
- S 51, WoO 17 – Kyrie for Litania in A minor
- S 52, WoO 22 – Pro te respirar in E major
- S 53 – Sub tuum praesidium in B♭ major
- S 54 – Salve Regina in G major
- S 55 – Plus non timet
- S 56, WoO 26 – Le vicende d'Amore
- S 57 – Amis connaissez-vous
- S 58 – Wieder she'ich
- S 59 – Des bergers de nos hameaux
- S 60 – Le bonheur de vivre au village
- S 61, WoO 29 – Die Messenier
- S 62, WoO 33 – Pigmalione
- S 63, WoO 23 – Bassoon Concerto in F major
- S 64 – Ja der Himmel (incomplete)
- S 65 – Die beyden Genies (lost)
- S 66, WoO 21 – Alma virgo Mater Dei in F major
- S 67, WoO 13 – Mass in D minor
- S 68, WoO 19 – O virgo itemerata in A major
- S 69 – Das Fest des Dankes und Freude (lost)
- S 70, WoO 16 – Te Deum in D major
- S 71, WoO 27 – Die vereitelten Ranke
- S 72 – In aeternum jubilantes in F major
- S 73, WoO 25 – Diana ed Endimione
- S 74, WoO 12 – Mass in C major
- S 76 – Cantata for the Name Day of Mr. Zinzendorf
- S 77, WoO 36 – Lob der Freundschaft
- S 78, WoO 5 – Clarinet Quartet in E♭ major
- S 79, WoO 18 – Salve Regina in B♭ major
- S 80 – Contredanse in B♭ major
- S 81 – 5 Ecossaises
- S 82 – 7 Ländler
- S 83 – 3 Military Marches
- S 84 – 3 Pieces for Ballet or Pantomime
- S 85 – Stadt und Land (incomplete)
- S 86 – O ihr Geliebten
- S 87 – Cantata for the Wedding of Emperor Napoleon and Marie-Louise of Austria
- S 88, WoO 32 – Das Zauberschlofl
- S 89 – Ich gratulir' zum Namenfest
- S 90, WoO 28 – Das Haus ist zu verkaufen
- S 91, WoO 38 – Euterpens Abschied
- S 92, WoO 34 – Der Zauberkampf
- S 94 – Scena for Mourning of Haydn
- S 95 – Fünf sind Zwey
- S 96, WoO 20 – Offertory in F major
- S 97 – Der Junker in der Mühle
- S 99, WoO 35 – Der Löwe von Kurdistan
- S 100 – Angelica
- S 101 – Die Eselshaut oder Die blaue Insel
- S 102 – Frohlocket Freunden
- S 103 – Overture to Die gute Nachricht in D major
- S 104 – 12 Waltzes for orchestra in E♭ major
- S 105 – Die Ahnfrau
- S 106a – Arrangement of Himmel's overture for piano trio
- S 106b – Arrangement of Himmel's overture for piano duet
- S 107 – Arrangement of Beethoven's overture to Prometheus in C major
- S 108–130 – Arrangement of overtures by various composers
- S 131 – Arrangement of Beethoven's Symphony No. 7 in A major
- S 132 – Arrangement of Beethoven's Symphony No. 2 in D major
- S 133 – Arrangement of Beethoven's Symphony No. 3 in E♭ major
- S 134 – Arrangement of Beethoven's Symphony No. 4 in B♭ major
- S 135 – Arrangement of Beethoven's Symphony No. 5 in C minor
- S 136 – Arrangement of Beethoven's Symphony No. 6 in F major
- S 137 – Arrangement of Beethoven's Symphony No. 1 in C major
- S 138 – Arrangement of Mozart's Piano Concerto K 466 in D minor
- S 139 – Arrangement of Mozart's Piano Concerto K 503 in C major
- S 140 – Arrangement of Mozart's Piano Concerto K 365 in E♭ major
- S 141 – Arrangement of Mozart's Piano Concerto K 491 in C minor
- S 142 – Arrangement of Mozart's Piano Concerto K 537 in D major
- S 143 – Arrangement of Mozart's Piano Concerto K 482 in E♭ major
- S 144 – Arrangement of Mozart's Piano Concerto K 456 in B♭ major
- S 145 – Variation on God Save the King for piano
- S 146 – Rondino for harp & piano in E♭ major
- S 147 – Piece for flute in G major
- S 148 – Freudenfest-Ouverture in D major
- S 149 – Romanza for piano in E♭ major
- S 150 – Arrangement of Beethoven's Septet op 20 in E♭ major
- S 150a – Piano accompaniment for 2 songs by P. Hédouin
- S 151 – Arrangement of Mozart's Symphony K 504 in D major
- S 152 – Arrangement of Mozart's Symphony K 550 in G minor
- S 153 – Arrangement of Mozart's Symphony K 543 in E♭ major
- S 154 – Arrangement of Mozart's Symphony K 425 in C major
- S 155 – Arrangement of Mozart's Symphony K 385 in D major
- S 156 – Arrangement of Mozart's Symphony K 551 in C major
- S 157 – Ausführlich theoretisch-practische Anweisung zum Pianoforte Spiel
- S 158 – Birthday Cantata for Goethe (1822)
- S 159 – Birthday Cantata for Prince Weimar-Sachsen (1823)
- S 160 – Birthday Cantata for Prince Weimar-Sachsen (revised version)
- S 161 – Variation on a waltz by Diabelli for piano
- S 162 – Marche à la romaine for piano in E♭ major
- S 163 – Attila (lost)
- S 164 – Variations for piano in E major
- S 165 – Rondoletto for piano in C major
- S 166 – Einmal nur in unserm Leben
- S 167 – Birthday Cantata for Goethe (1825)
- S 167a – Album piece for piano
- S 168, WoO 7 – Impromptu in Canone for piano in G major
- S 169 – 5 Settings of Scottish Songs for Thompson
- S 170, WoO 37 – Morgen opfer
- S 171 – Strahlen die aus Osten stammen
- S 172 – Birthday Cantata for Prince Weimar-Sachsen (1827)
- S 173 – Song for the Birthday of Goethe (1827)
- S 174 – Arrangement of Andreas Romberg's Symphony No.1 in E♭ major
- S 175, WoO 39 – Have!
- S 176 – Volkslied aller Deutschen
- S 177 – Song for the Birthday of Goethe in B♭ major
- S 178 – Trauermusik
- S 179 – Cantata for the Wedding of Princess Augusta von Weimar-Sachsen
- S 180 – Song for the Birthday of Goethe (1829)
- S 181, WoO 9 – Adagio for piano in D♭ major
- S 182 – 12 Settings of Scottish Songs for Thompson
- S 183 – Arrangement of Haydn's Symphony No. 100 in G major
- S 185 – Arrangement of Haydn's Symphony No. 44 in E minor
- S 186 – Canon: Think on your friend
- S 187, WoO 10 – Variation for piano on "Rule Britannia"
- S 188 – Piano piece in A♭ major
- S 189 – Canon a 3
- S 190, WoO 8 – Fantasia for piano in C major "Souvenir de Paganini"
- S 191 – Study for piano in B♭ major
- S 192 – Doubt not love (lost)
- S 193 – Klarster Stimmen
- S 194 – Impromptu for piano in F major
- S 195 – Song for the Birthday of Goethe (1831)
- S 196 – Beständiges
- S 197 – 3 Settings of Scottish Songs for Thompson
- S 198 – Epilogue for Gluck's Armide
- S 199 – The orphan's ode to the patrious
- S 200 – Finale for the 3rd curtain of Errol's Zampa (lost)
- S 201 – Piece for Der Löwe von Kurdistan
- S 202 – Canon: Muntre Gärten
- S 203 – Landestren
- S 204 – Finale for Gustave III
- S 205 – Impromptu for 2 pianos in C major
- S 206, WoO 31 – Das Zauberglöckchen

== Works not included in any catalogue ==
- Partita in B♭ major
- Piano Sonata No. 7 in G major
- Piano Sonata No. 8 in A♭ major
- Piano Sonata No. 9 in C major
- Adagio and Rondo alla Polacca for Violin and Orchestra in A major
- Serenade in E♭ major
- Violin Concerto in G major (incomplete) (about 1806) completed in 1998 by Gregory Rose
- Wind Sextet in F major
