= Joseph Franque =

French painter

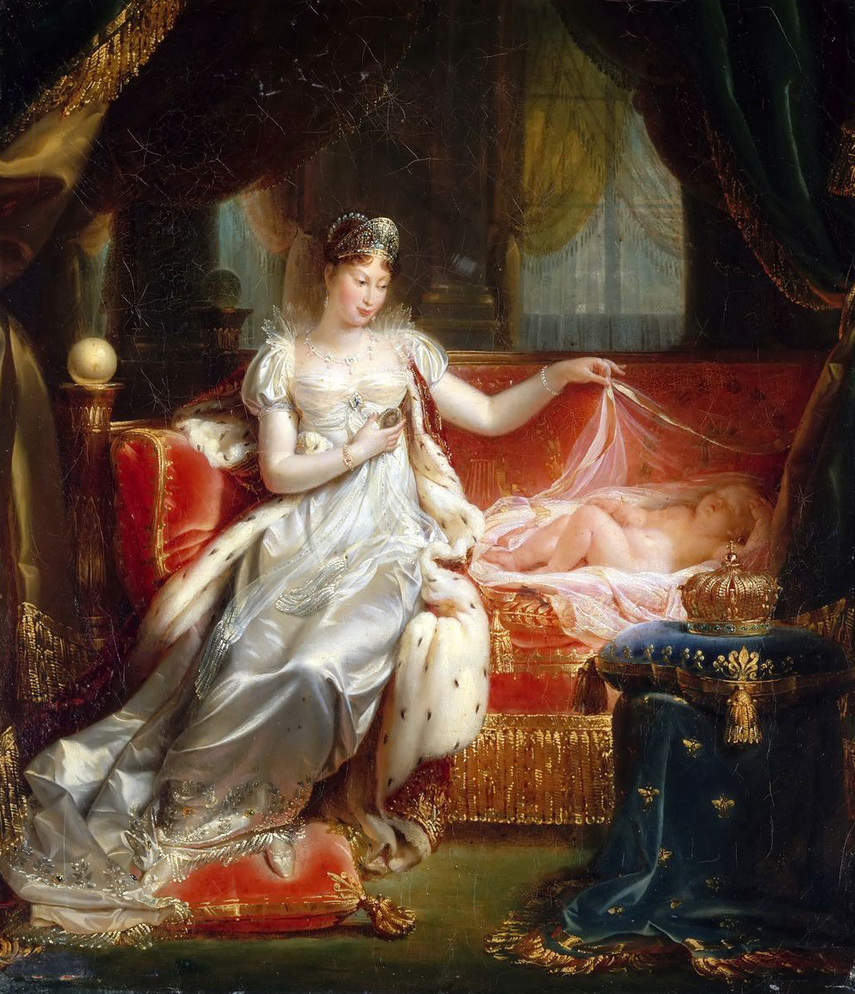
Marie Louise with the King of Rome, 1811

Joseph-Boniface Francou, known as Joseph Franque (11 August 1774, Buis-les-Baronnies - 14 November 1833, Naples) was a French portrait painter who worked in Italy.

== Life and work ==
He was the twin brother of Jean-Pierre Franque, who was also a portrait painter. They went to Paris together to pursue a career in art. In 1792, both received financial assistance for their studies from the National Convention. Sometime after 1794, they became students of Jacques-Louis David and were influenced by the Secte des Barbus, led by Pierre-Maurice Quays. Both had their debuts at the Salon of 1806.

In 1812 Joseph left France for Italy, where Elisa Bonaparte had appointed him to be an art teacher at the Accademia di Belle Arti di Carrara. He also served as her court painter. After the fall of the Napoleonic Empire, he was invited to be a drawing teacher at the Accademia di Belle Arti di Napoli, eventually becoming a Professor in 1823.

His portrayal of the Empress Marie Louise watching over her son, Napoleon II, is on display in the Palace of Versailles. Several of his portraits, notably two of Charles Ferdinand, Duke of Berry, may be seen at the Galleria dell'Accademia. His Scene During the Eruption of Vesuvius (1827) is at the Philadelphia Museum of Art.
