= Marie Louise with the King of Rome =

Painting by Joseph Franque

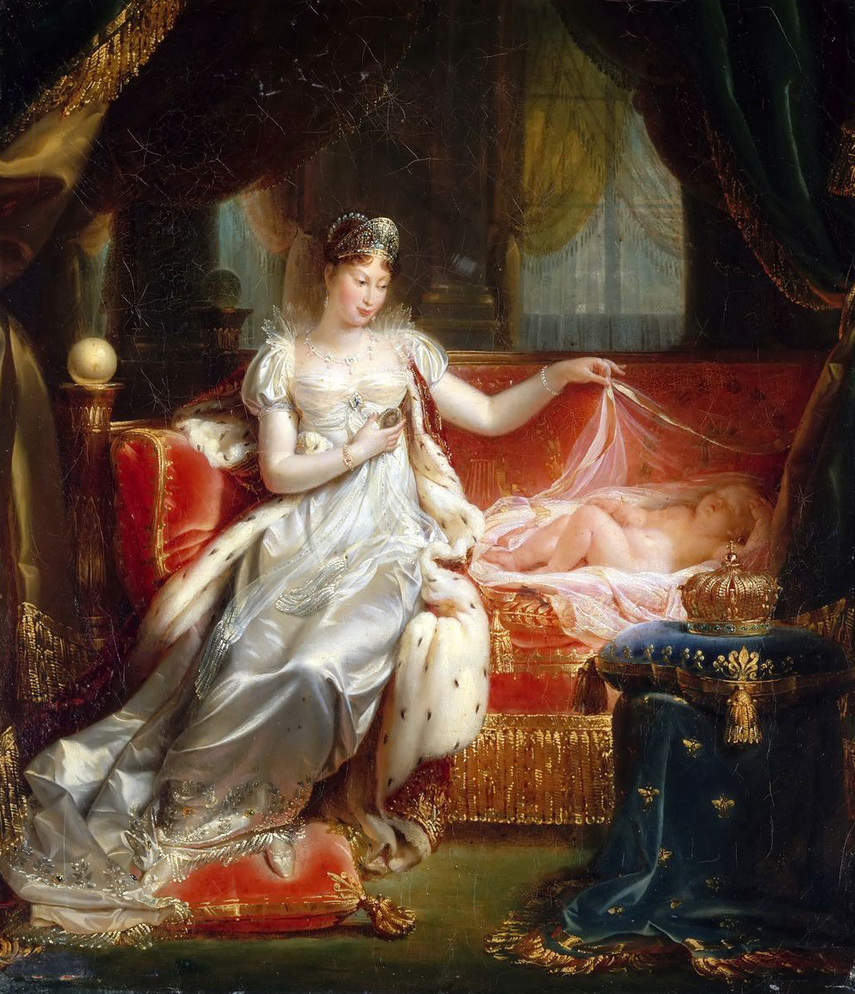
- Artist: Joseph Franque
- Year: 1811
- Type: Oil on canvas, portrait painting
- Dimensions: 52 cm × 45 cm (20 in × 18 in)
- Location: Palace of Versailles; Versailles

Marie Louise with the King of Rome (French: Marie-Louise, impératrice des Français et le roi de Rome) is an 1811 portrait painting by the French artist Joseph Franque. A double portrait, it depicts Marie Louise, the second wife of Napoleon, with her son the King of Rome. Napoleon had divorced his fist wife Josephine in 1809 in order to marry Marie Louise, the daughter of Emperor Francis I of Austria. On 20 March 1811 she gave birth to the son and heir he craved.

The painting was displayed at the Salon of 1812 held at the Louvre in Paris. The last Salon to be held before Napoleon"s downfall, it featured many works celebrating the Bonaparte dynasty of which this painting is typical. It was purchased from the Salon by Napoleon for the Elysée Palace. Today it is in the collection of the Palace of Versailles.

== Bibliography ==
- Maison, Françoise. Le Pourpre et l'exil: l'aiglon et le prince impérial. Réunion des Musées nationaux, 2004.
- Sérullaz, Arlette. French Painting; The Revolutionary Decades, 1760-1830. Art Gallery of New South Wales, 1980.
