= Anne-Françoise de Fougeret =

Madame de Fougeret
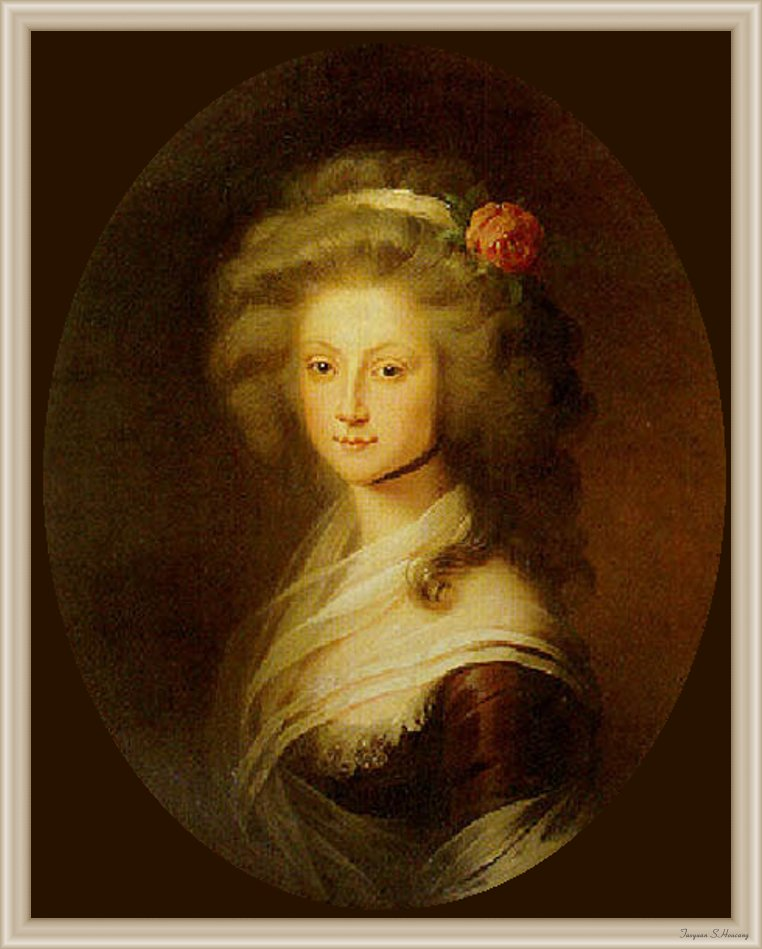
- Born: Anne-Francoise Outremont; 1745; Paris
- Died: 1818 (aged 72–73)
- Known for: founding Société de Charité Maternelle
- Spouse: Jean Fougeret de Chateau Renard

Anne-Françoise de Fougeret born Anne-Françoise Outremont (1745–1813), was a French socialite and philanthropist who founded one of the first secular women's charity organizations in France, the Société de Charité Maternelle.

== Life ==
Anne-Françoise de Fougeret was married to the rich Parisian financier Jean Fougeret de Chateau Renard, and the mother of the memoir writers Angélique de Maussion and Elisa de Menerville.

Both her father and her spouse were active within charity. Anne-Françoise de Fougeret had originally been involved in finding wet nurses for abandoned infants, using older women from her husband's estates. They fed the children goat's and cow's milk but three-quarters of them died. De Fougeret realised that the best solution was to help poor mothers feed and nurture their infants, preventing their abandonment.

In 1788, de Fougeret founded the Société de Charité Maternelle to support poor mothers and children. She was its first president, under the protection of Queen Marie Antoinette. The charity continued to operate during the French Revolution, but stopped during the Reign of Terror. In 1801, the charity was revived. De Fougeret's daughters became involved with the charity, but she remained a non-participating member.

During the Reign of Terror, the entire Fougeret family (with the exception of her daughter Elisa, who was abroad), was imprisoned. De Fougeret's husband was guillotined, but the rest of the family was released after the fall of Robespierre.
