= Société de Charité Maternelle =

French Charity Organisation

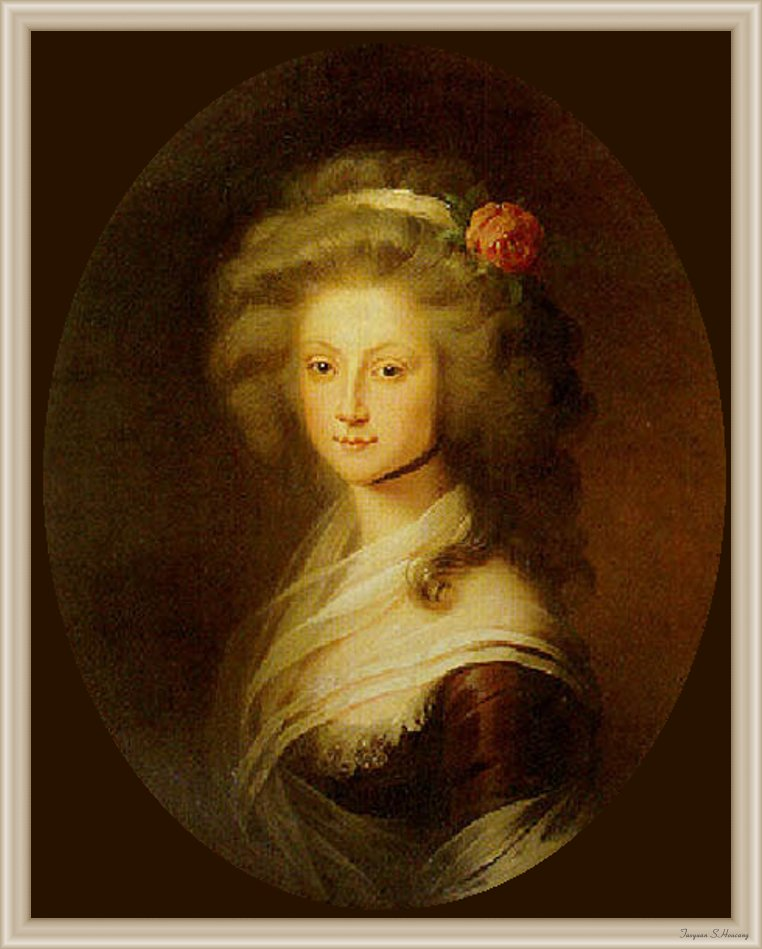
Madame de Fougeret

Société de Charité Maternelle or Société maternelle was a French charity organization, founded in 1788.

== Life ==
It was founded by Anne-Françoise de Fougeret in Paris in May 1788. However, it was not formally inaugurated until 4 January 1790, when the first meeting was held in the Tuileries Palace in the presence of queen Marie Antoinette, who had accepted the position of Honorary President and Honorary Founder as well as Protector of the Société, whose actual President and founder were Anne-Françoise de Fougeret. After this, their meetings were regularly held at the Hôpital des Enfants Trouves.

The purpose of the Société was to provide financial aide to poor mothers, particularly mothers of infants. It was inspired by the common phenomena of poor mothers turning in their children to the custody of the hospitals, were conditions were so bad that the mortality of children were high. Women were given aide after the Société had investigated them through visit and inspection, and approved of them as worthy of help.

The Société belonged to a then new and modern trend of private secular charity organizations. These were to become typical in the 19th century, but in the 18th century they were fairly new, since charity and social help had normally been managed by the church until then. It was also a pioneer innovation in the fact that the Société was managed exclusively by women and thus were a secular women's organization in a time period when women's organizations had until then normally been religious.

The Société was closed in 1793 during the Reign of Terror, but reopened in 1801. Emperor Napoleon I took control of the Société in 1810 and made it in to an Imperial umbrella organization, inducted all other similar French women's charity organizations in it, and appointed Empress Marie Louise as its Honorary President. The Société continued to be given protection by the state and placed under royal women under the following French regimes: under Marie-Thérèse, Duchess of Angoulême until 1830, by Maria Amalia of Naples and Sicily during the July monarchy and by Eugénie de Montijo during the Second French Empire.
