= Elisa de Ménerville =

French memoir writer

Elisa de Ménerville (born 1768; fl. 1797) was a French memoir writer. She is known for her memoirs, describing her life during the French Revolution.

She was born to the rich banker Jean Fougeret and the philanthropist Anne-Françoise de Fougeret, sister of the memoirist Angélique de Maussion, and married to a nobleman. She left France with her spouse and two daughters in 1791, lived a comfortable life in the Austrian Netherlands. During the French invasion, they fled to London via the Dutch Republic. In London, their funds dried up, and Elisa de Ménerville supported her husband and daughters by painting fans, embroider tapestries and clothing and give lessons in the French language. During her exile, her family in France were arrested and executed during the Reign of Terror. She returned to France in 1797. Upon her return, the family had lost all their remaining property in France.

== Memoirs ==
Her memoirs, Souvenirs d'émigration, describe the Women's march to Versailles, her life in exile in the Austrian Netherlands (1791-1793), the Dutch Republic (1794) and London (1794-1797). Her memoirs are representative for noblewomen in exile during the revolution, but give an unusual description of the working life of female exiles in the London emigré community.
