= Marie Louise, Duchess of Parma =

Empress of the French from 1810 to 1814

Marie Louise
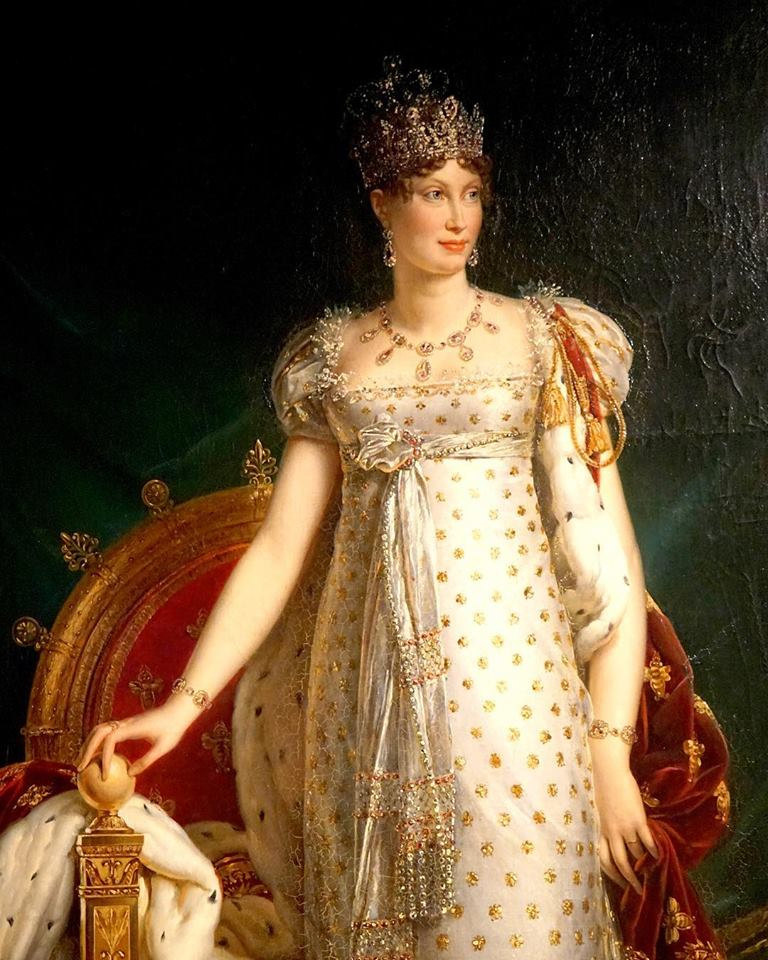
- Portrait by Jean-Baptiste Paulin Guérin, c. 1812

Duchess of Parma, Piacenza and Guastalla
- Reign: 11 April 1814 – 17 December 1847
- Predecessors: Jean-Jacques-Régis (Parma); Charles-François (Piacenza); Pauline (Guastalla)
- Successors: Charles II (Parma and Piacenza); Francis V (Guastalla)

Empress consort of the French Queen consort of Italy
- Tenure: 1 April 1810 – 6 April 1814
- Born: Archduchess Maria Ludovica of Austria; 12 December 1791; Hofburg, Vienna, Austria
- Died: 17 December 1847 (aged 56); Parma, Parma and Piacenza
- Burial: Imperial Crypt
- Spouses: Napoleon I, Emperor of the French (m. 1810; died 1821) Count Adam Albert von Neipperg (m. 1821; died 1829) Charles-René de Bombelles (m. 1834)
- Issue: Napoleon II, Emperor of the French; Countess Albertine von Neipperg; William Albert, 1st Prince of Montenuovo; Countess Mathilde von Neipperg
Names
- German: Maria Ludovica Leopoldina Franziska Theresia Josepha Lucia; French: Marie Louise Léopoldine Françoise Thérèse Josèphe Lucie; Italian: Maria Luigia Leopoldina Francesca Teresa Giuseppa Lucia
- House: Habsburg-Lorraine
- Father: Francis II, Holy Roman Emperor
- Mother: Maria Theresa of Naples and Sicily

Marie Louise (Maria Ludovica Leopoldina Franziska Theresia Josepha Lucia; 12 December 1791 – 17 December 1847) was Duchess of Parma from 11 April 1814 until her death in 1847. She was Napoleon's second wife and as such Empress of the French and Queen of Italy from their marriage on 2 April 1810 until his abdication on 6 April 1814.

As the eldest child of Francis II, Holy Roman Emperor and Emperor of Austria, and his second wife, Maria Theresa of Naples and Sicily, Marie Louise grew up during a period marked by ongoing and unceasing conflict between Austria and revolutionary France. A series of military defeats at the hands of Napoleon Bonaparte had inflicted a heavy human toll on Austria and led Francis to dissolve the Holy Roman Empire. The end of the War of the Fifth Coalition resulted in the marriage of Napoleon and Marie Louise in 1810, which ushered in a brief period of peace and friendship between Austria and the French Empire, much like prior alliances between the Austrian and French Royal family. Marie Louise agreed to the marriage despite being raised to despise France. She bore Napoleon a son, styled the King of Rome at birth, who briefly succeeded him as Napoleon II. Marie Louise's son was later titled Duke of Reichstadt.

Napoleon's fortunes changed dramatically in 1812 after his failed invasion of Russia. The European powers, including Austria, resumed hostilities towards France in the War of the Sixth Coalition, which ended with the abdication of Napoleon and his exile to Elba. The 1814 Treaty of Fontainebleau gave the Duchies of Parma, Piacenza and Guastalla to Marie Louise, who ruled the duchies until her death.

Marie Louise married morganatically twice after Napoleon's death in 1821. Her second husband was Count Adam Albert von Neipperg (married 1821), an equerry she met in 1814. She and Neipperg had three children: Albertine, William Albert, and Mathilde. Neipperg died in 1829. Marie Louise married Count Charles-René de Bombelles, her chamberlain, in 1834. She died in Parma in 1847.

== Early life ==
Archduchess Marie Louise of Austria (who was given the Latin baptismal name of Maria Ludovica Leopoldina Francisca Theresa Josepha Lucia) was born at the Hofburg Palace in Vienna on 12 December 1791 to Archduke Francis of Austria and his second wife, Maria Theresa of Naples and Sicily. She was named after her grandmother, Marie Louise, Holy Roman Empress. Her father became Holy Roman Emperor a year later as Francis II. Marie Louise was a great-granddaughter of Empress Maria Theresa through both her parents, as they were double first cousins. She was also a maternal granddaughter of Queen Maria Carolina of Naples, Marie Antoinette's favorite sister. She was known as Luisel to her family.

Marie Louise's formative years were during a period of conflict between France and her family. She was brought up to detest France and French ideas. Her upbringing was supervised by her French imperial governess Victoire de Folliot de Crenneville. Marie Louise was influenced by her grandmother Maria Carolina, who despised the French Revolution which ultimately caused the death of her sister, Marie Antoinette. Maria Carolina's Kingdom of Naples had also come into direct conflict with French forces led by Napoleon Bonaparte. The War of the Third Coalition brought Austria to the brink of ruin, which increased Marie Louise's resentment towards Napoleon. The Imperial family was forced to flee Vienna in 1805. Marie Louise took refuge in Hungary and later Galicia before returning to Vienna in 1806. Her father relinquished the title of Holy Roman Emperor but remained Emperor of Austria.

To make her more marriageable, her parents had her tutored in many languages. In addition to her native German, she became fluent in English, French, Italian, Latin, and Spanish. To maintain her purity, her parents allowed for little to no contact with men, and even all her animals, including a pet rabbit, were required to be female.

In 1807, when Marie Louise was 15, her mother died after suffering a miscarriage. Less than a year later, Emperor Francis married his first cousin Maria Ludovika Beatrix of Austria-Este, who was four years older than Marie Louise. Nonetheless, Maria Ludovika Beatrix took on a maternal role towards her stepdaughter. She was also bitter towards the French, who had deprived her father of the Duchy of Modena.

Another war broke out between France and Austria in 1809, which resulted in defeat for the Austrians again. The Imperial family had to flee Vienna again before the city surrendered on 12 May. Their journey was hampered by bad weather, and they arrived in Buda "wet through, and nearly worn out with fatigue".

== Marriage proposal ==
After escaping an assassination attempt in Vienna, while negotiating the Treaty of Schönbrunn on 12 October 1809, Emperor Napoleon decided that he needed an heir to cement his relatively young Empire. He also sought the validation and legitimization of his Empire by marrying a member of one of the leading royal families of Europe. He began proceedings to divorce Joséphine de Beauharnais, and per his family's wishes, he began searching for a new empress. His wish to marry Grand Duchess Anna Pavlovna of Russia, the youngest sister of Tsar Alexander I of Russia, caused alarm in Austria, where they were afraid of being sandwiched between two great powers allied with each other. At the persuasion of Prince Metternich, a marriage between Napoleon and Marie Louise was suggested by Emperor Francis to the Count of Narbonne but no official overture was made by the Austrians. Though officials in Paris and Austria were beginning to accept the possibility of the union, Marie Louise was kept uninformed of developments.

Frustrated by the Russians delaying the marriage negotiations, Napoleon rescinded his proposal in late January 1810 and began negotiations to marry Marie Louise with the Austrian ambassador, the Prince of Schwarzenberg. Schwarzenberg signed the marriage contract on 7 February. Marie Louise was informed of the marriage by Metternich. When asked for consent, she replied: "I wish only what my duty commands me to wish."

However, earlier in life, a young Marie Louise had referred to Napoleon as "Krampus" and even "the Anti-Christ" in her letters to her governess, and when word got to Marie Louise that Napoleon was searching for a wife, she wrote: "I pity the poor princess whom he'll choose". At the time of Napoleon's proposal, she actually hoped to marry Francis IV, Duke of Modena, who was the older brother of her step-mother.

== Wedding ==
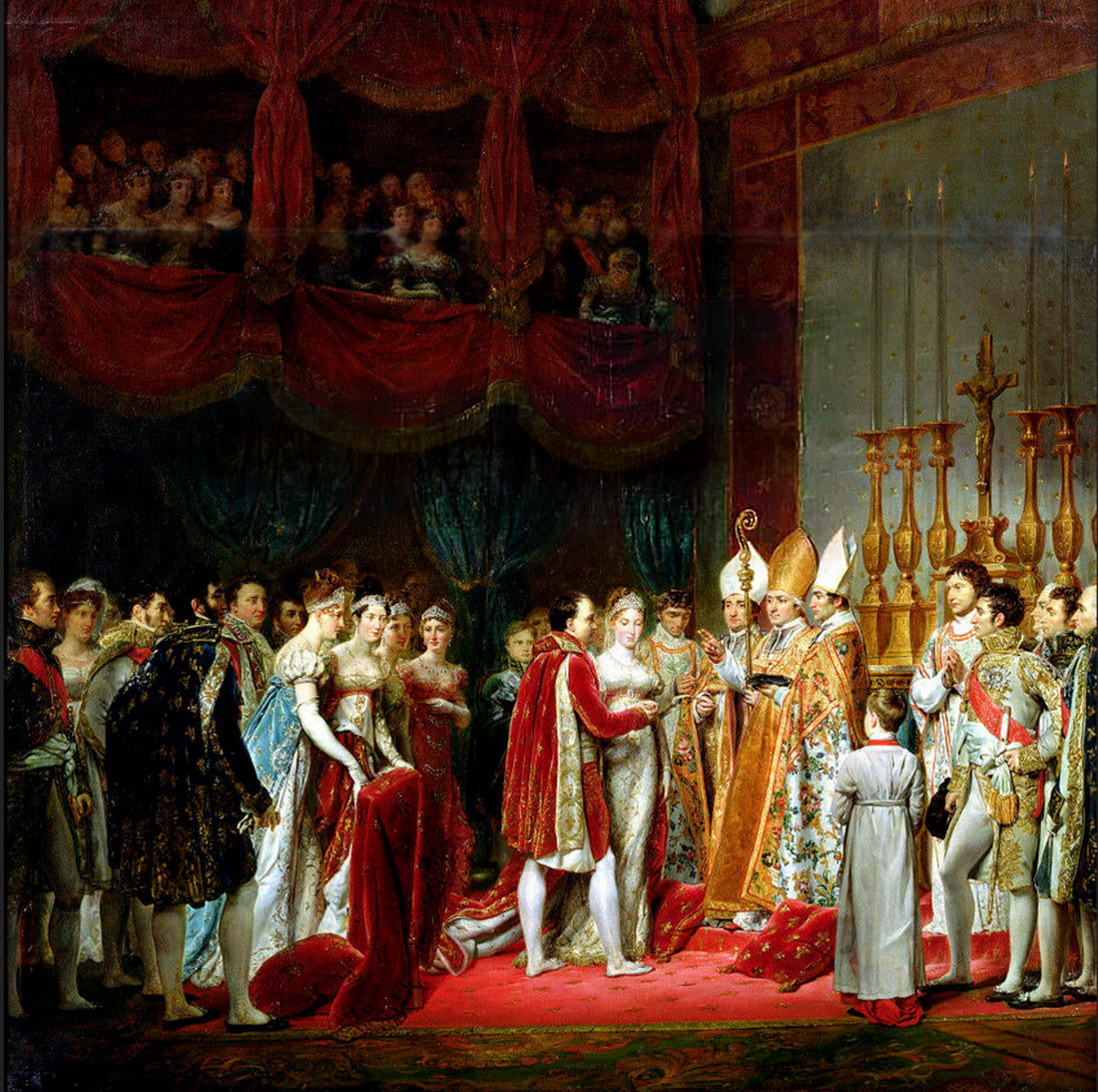
The Wedding of Napoleon and Marie Louise by Georges Rouget, 1810

Marie Louise was married by proxy to Napoleon on 11 March 1810 at the Augustinian Church, Vienna. Napoleon was represented by Archduke Charles, the bride's uncle. According to the French ambassador, the marriage "was celebrated with a magnificence that it would be hard to surpass, by the side of which even the brilliant festivities that have preceded it are not to be mentioned". She became Empress of the French and Queen of Italy.

Marie Louise departed Vienna on 13 March, probably expecting never to return. Napoleon wanted the ceremony to follow the protocol used forty years earlier for Marie Antoinette. The young Austrian princess passed successively through three small temporary wooden rooms (Austrian room, neutral room and French room): in the first, she undressed; in the second, she dressed in clothes brought by the French imperial court and was received by Napoleon's youngest sister, the Queen of Naples Caroline Bonaparte; in the third, she truly became French. When she finally met Napoleon, she said, "You are much better-looking than your portrait."

Drawing for the temple of Hymen, final firework display at the Celebration of the Marriage of Napoleon and Marie Louise at the Residence of Princess Pauline Borghèse, the Palais De Neuilly

The civil wedding was held at the Saint James Church on 1 April 1810. The next day, Napoleon and Marie Louise made the journey to Paris in the coronation coach. The Imperial Guard cavalry led the procession, followed by the herald-at-arms and then the carriages. The Marshals of France rode on each side, near the doors of the carriages. The procession arrived at the Tuileries Palace, and the Imperial couple made their way to the Salon Carré chapel (in the Louvre) for the religious wedding ceremony. The ceremony was conducted by Cardinal Joseph Fesch, Grand Almoner of France and Napoleon's uncle. A Bridal March was composed for the occasion by Ferdinando Paer, and a cantata by Johann Nepomuk Hummel.

Elaborate celebrations continued to be held in May and June 1810. These included a ball, a masque, a sea-battle on the Seine, and a display of fireworks created by Claude-Fortuné Ruggieri, for 4,000 people.

By this marriage, Napoleon became the great-nephew-in-law of Louis XVI and Marie-Antoinette.

== Marriage to Napoleon ==
=== Life as empress ===
Marie Louise was excited as Napoleon's wife and settled in quickly in the French court. She developed a close friendship with her Première dame d'honneur, the Duchess of Montebello, while most of the daily affairs were handled by her Dame d'atour Jeanne Charlotte du Luçay. Napoleon initially remarked that he had "married a womb" to an aide, but their relationship soon grew. He "spared no pains" to please her and claimed at one point to prefer Marie Louise to his first wife Joséphine; while he had loved Joséphine, and though he claimed Joséphine remained his greatest friend even after their amicable divorce, and that he still would choose her, whereas with Marie Louise, there was "Never a lie, never a debt" – presumably a reference to Joséphine's rumoured extramarital affairs and reputation as a spendthrift. Marie Louise wrote to her father: "I assure you, dear papa, that people have done great injustice to the Emperor. The better one knows him, the better one appreciates and loves him." However, the marriage was not without tension; Napoleon sometimes remarked to aides that Marie Louise was too shy and timid, compared to the outgoing and passionate Josephine, with whom he remained in close contact, upsetting Marie Louise.

The excitement surrounding the wedding ushered in a period of peace and friendship between France and Austria, who had been largely at war for the last two decades. The people of Vienna, who hated Napoleon only months before, were suddenly in full praise of the French Emperor. Flattering letters were sent between Napoleon and Emperor Francis, Empress Maria Ludovika Beatrix and Archduke Charles during the wedding festivities.

During public occasions, Marie Louise spoke little due to reserve and timidity, which some observers mistook for haughtiness. She was regarded as a quiet woman and never interfered in politics. Privately, she was polite and gentle.

Napoleon arranged for Marie Louise to participate in some carefully selected charity assignments, most notably the Société de Charité Maternelle, for which he made her Honorary President.

=== Birth of first child ===
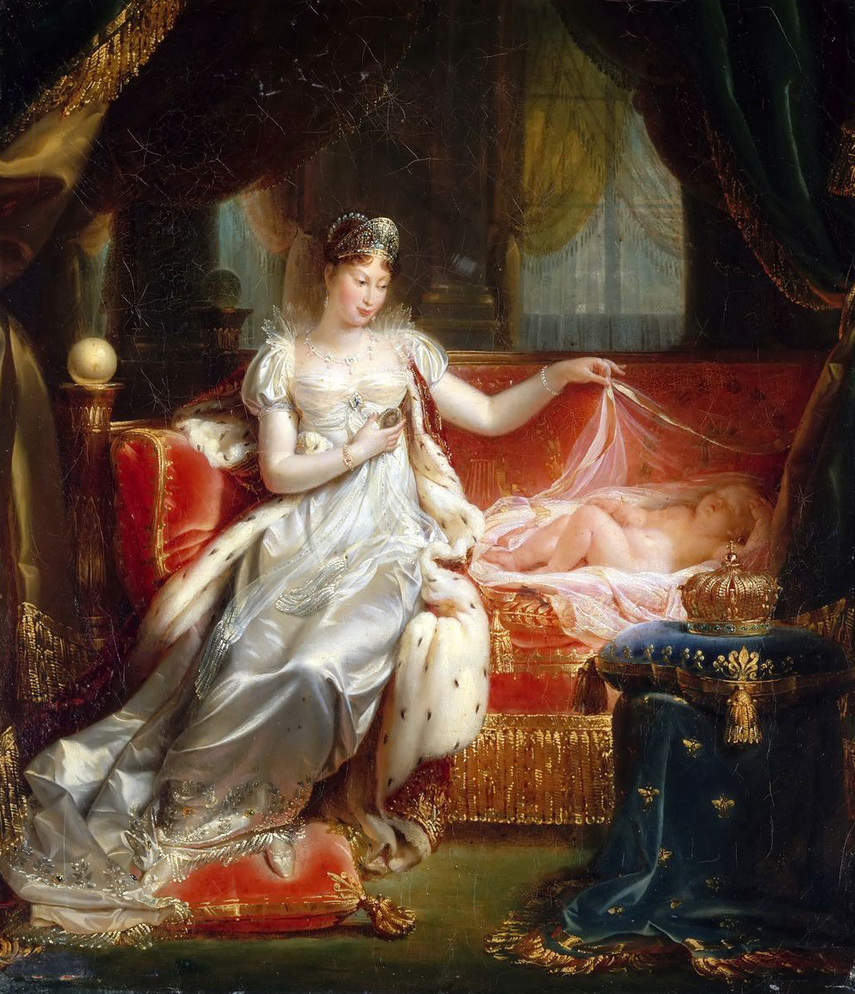
Marie Louise with the King of Rome by Joseph Franque, 1811

Marie Louise became pregnant by July 1810 and gave birth to a son on 20 March 1811. The boy, Napoléon François Joseph Charles Bonaparte, was given the title King of Rome, in accordance with the practice where the heir apparent to the Holy Roman Empire was called the King of the Romans. Napoleon was delighted that his wife survived the ordeal and said: "I had rather never have any more children than see her suffer so much again."

Marie Louise was devoted to her son; she had him brought to her every morning and visited him in his apartment in the course of the day.

=== Resumption of war ===
In May 1812, a month before the French invasion of Russia, Marie Louise accompanied Napoleon to Dresden, where she met her father and stepmother. Emperor Francis told Napoleon he could count on Austria for the "triumph of the common cause", a reference to the impending war. A minor rivalry began to develop between Marie Louise and the Empress of Austria, who was jealous at being upstaged in appearance by her stepdaughter. It was also in Dresden where she met Count Adam Albert von Neipperg for the first time. She would marry him morganatically after her husband Napoleon I died on St. Helena in 1821. Napoleon left Dresden on 29 May to take charge of his army.

Marie Louise then travelled to Prague, where she spent a few weeks with the Austrian Imperial family, before returning to Saint Cloud on 18 July. She kept in touch with Napoleon throughout the war. The invasion of Russia ended disastrously for France. More than half of the Grande Armée was destroyed by the Russian Winter and guerrilla attacks. After the failed Malet coup of October 1812, Napoleon hastened his return to France and reunited with his wife on the night of 18 December.

=== Collapse of the Empire ===
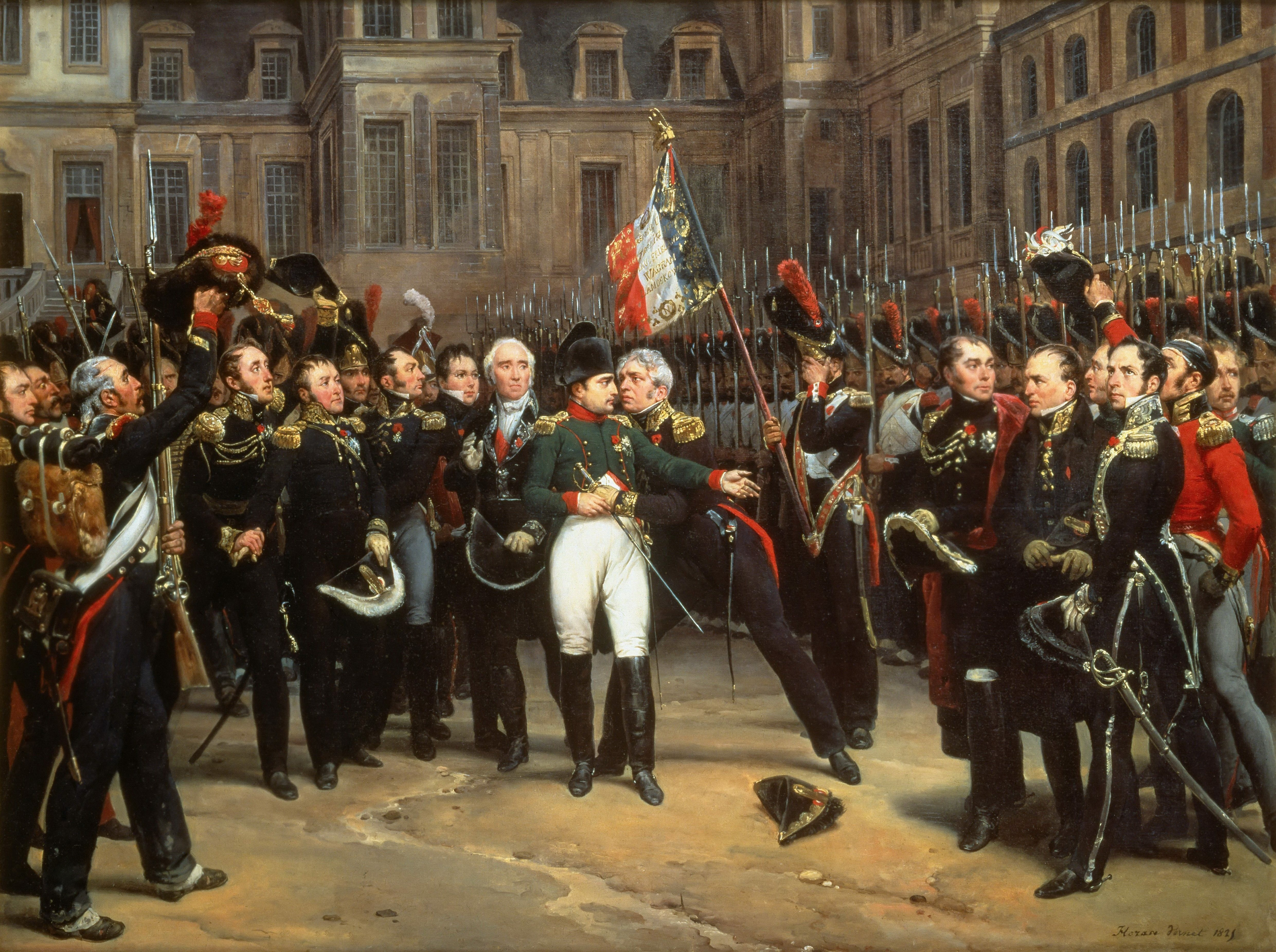
Napoleon Bids Farewell to His Guard by Horace Vernet. In April 1814 Napoleon attempted to abdicate in favour of his son with Marie Louise as regent

The weakened French position triggered the Sixth Coalition. Prussia allied with Russia and declared war on France (the United Kingdom was already at war with France), but Austria stayed out due to relations between the Imperial families. On 30 March, Marie Louise was appointed Regent as Napoleon set off for battle in Germany. The regency was only de jure, as all decisions were still taken by Napoleon and implemented by his most senior officials, including Lebrun, Joseph Bonaparte, Talleyrand and Savary. Marie Louise tried unsuccessfully to get her father to ally with France. Austria too joined the opposition to France. She maintained a correspondence with Napoleon, informing him of increasing demands for peace in Paris and the provinces. Napoleon was decisively defeated in Leipzig on 19 October and returned to Saint Cloud on 9 November.

On 23 January 1814, Marie Louise was appointed Regent for the second time. On 25 January, at 03:00 in the morning, Napoleon embraced Marie Louise and his son for the last time. He left to lead a hastily formed army to stave off the Allied invasion from the north.

As the Allies neared Paris, Marie Louise was reluctant to leave. She felt that as the daughter of the sovereign of Austria, one of the allied members, she would be treated with respect by Allied forces, with the possibility of her son succeeding the throne should Napoleon be deposed. She was also afraid that her departure would strengthen the royalist supporters of the Bourbons. Marie Louise was finally persuaded to leave by Henri Clarke, who received the order from Napoleon: "I would prefer to know that they [the Empress and the King of Rome] are both at the bottom of the Seine rather than in the hands of the foreigners." On 29 March, the court left Paris. The Allies entered the city the following day.

Marie Louise and the court moved to Blois, which was safe from the Allies. She did not expect her father to dethrone Napoleon and deprive her son of the crown of France. On 3 April, the Senate, at the instigation of Talleyrand, announced the deposition of the Emperor. Marie Louise was unaware of this until 7 April, and was astonished to discover the turn of events. She wanted to return to Paris, but was dissuaded from doing so by physician Jean-Nicolas Corvisart and the Duchess of Montebello.

=== Exile of Napoleon ===
Napoleon abdicated the throne on 11 April 1814 in Fontainebleau. The Treaty of Fontainebleau exiled him to Elba, allowed Marie Louise to retain her imperial rank and style and made her ruler of the duchies of Parma, Piacenza, and Guastalla, with her son as heir. This arrangement was later revised at the Congress of Vienna.

Marie Louise was strongly dissuaded from rejoining her husband by her advisors, who fed her accounts that Napoleon was distraught with grief over the death of Joséphine. On 16 April, her father arrived at Blois to meet her. At the advice of Emperor Francis, Marie Louise departed Rambouillet with her son for Vienna on 23 April. At Vienna, she stayed at Schönbrunn, where she received frequent visits from her sisters, but rarely from her father and stepmother. She met her grandmother, Maria Carolina, who disapproved of her deserting her husband. Distressed at being seen as a heartless wife and indifferent mother, she wrote on 9 August 1814: "I am in a very unhappy and critical position; I must be very prudent in my conduct. There are moments when that thought so distracts me that I think that the best thing I could do would be to die."

== Congress of Vienna and relationship with Neipperg ==
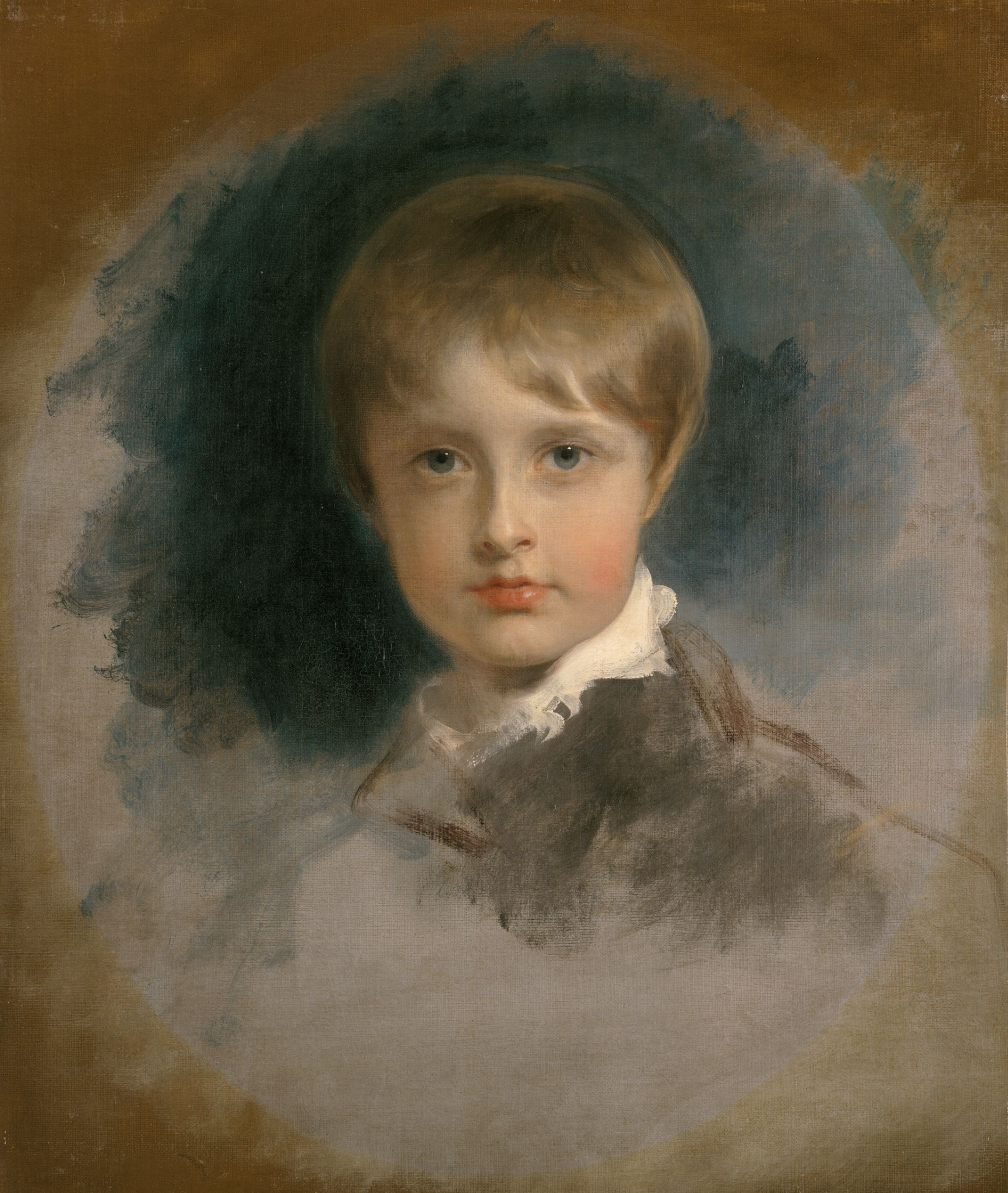
Portrait of Napoleon II by Thomas Lawrence. Painted in 1819 by which time he lived in Vienna.

In the summer of 1814, Emperor Francis sent Count Adam Albert von Neipperg to accompany Marie Louise to the spa town of Aix-les-Bains to prevent her from joining Napoleon on Elba. Neipperg was a confidant of Metternich and an enemy of Napoleon. Marie Louise fell in love with Neipperg. They became lovers. He became her chamberlain, and her advocate at the Congress of Vienna. News of the relationship was not received well by the French and the Austrian public.

When Napoleon escaped in March 1815 and reinstated his rule, the Allies once again declared war. Marie Louise was asked by her stepmother to join in the processions to pray for the success of the Austrian armies but rejected the insulting invitation. She passed a message to Napoleon's private secretary, Claude-François de Méneval, who was about to return to France: "I hope he will understand the misery of my position ... I shall never assent to a divorce, but I flatter myself that he will not oppose an amicable separation, and that he will not bear any ill feeling towards me ... This separation has become imperative; it will in no way affect the feelings of esteem and gratitude that I preserve." Napoleon was defeated for the last time at the Battle of Waterloo and was exiled to Saint Helena from October 1815. Napoleon made no further attempt to contact her personally.

The Congress of Vienna recognised Marie Louise as ruler of Parma, Piacenza, and Guastalla, but prevented her from bringing her son to Italy. It also made her Duchess of Parma for her life only, as the Allies did not want a descendant of Napoleon to have a hereditary claim over Parma. After her death, the duchy was to revert to the Bourbons.

== Duchess of Parma ==
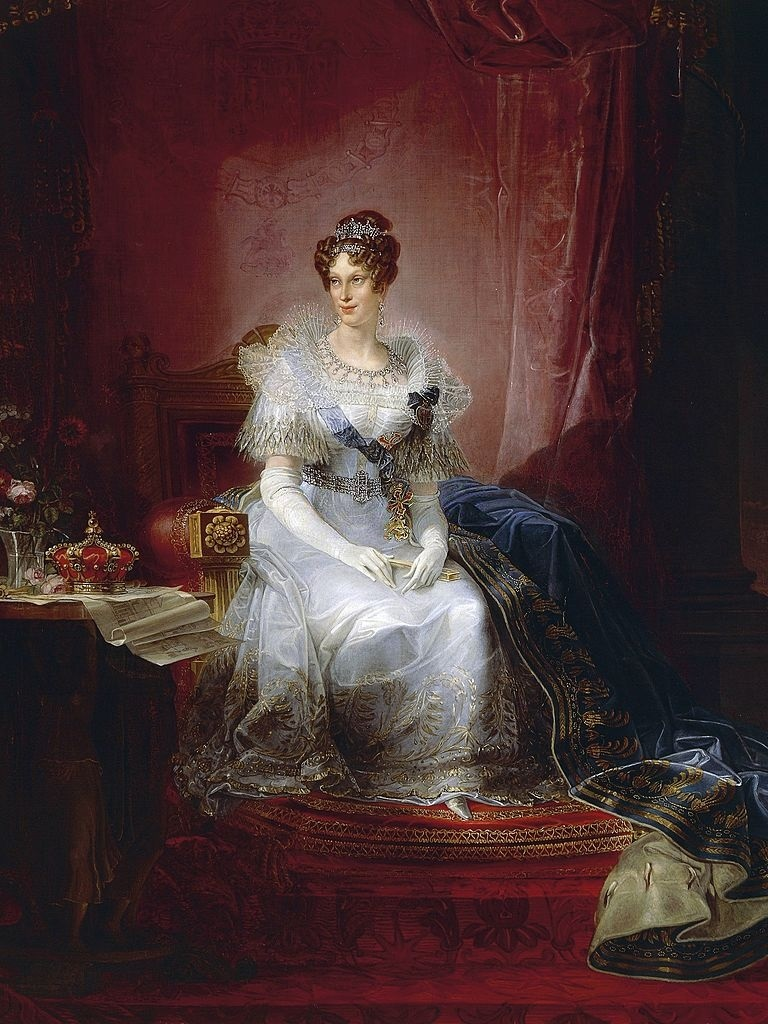
Portrait of Marie Louise by Giovanni Battista Borghesi, 1839

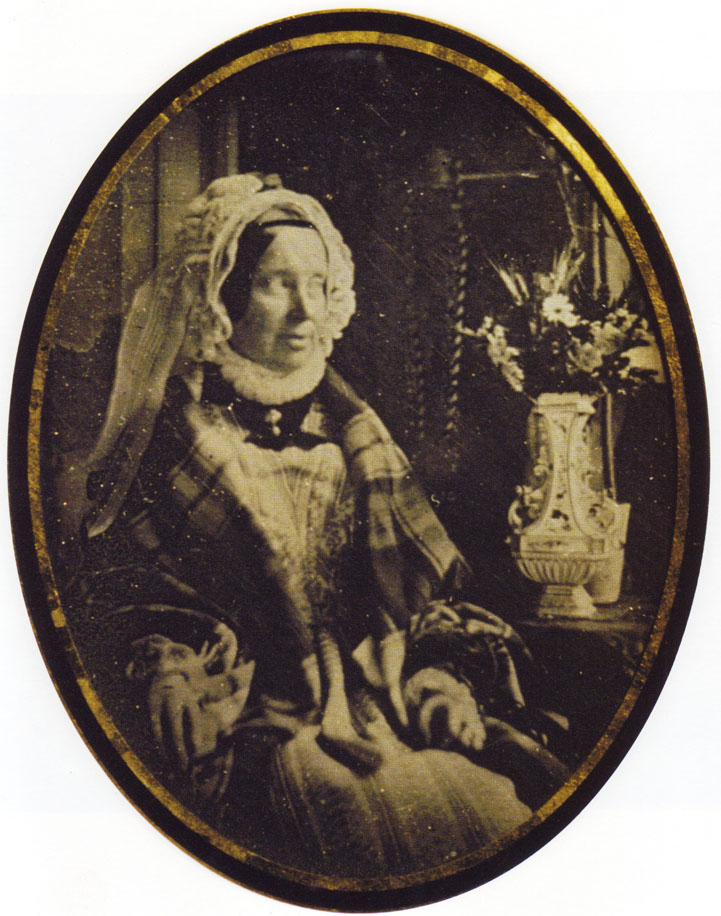
Daguerreotype of Marie Louise, 1847

Marie Louise departed for Parma on 7 March 1816, accompanied by Neipperg. She entered the duchy on 18 April. She wrote to her father: "People welcomed me with such enthusiasm that I had tears in my eyes." She largely left the running of day-to-day affairs to Neipperg, who received instructions from Metternich. In December 1816, Marie Louise removed the incumbent Grand Chamberlain (prime minister) and installed Neipperg.

She and Neipperg had four children:

- Albertine, Countess of Montenuovo (1817–1867), married Luigi Sanvitale, Count of Fontanellato
- William Albert, Count of Montenuovo, later created Prince of Montenuovo (1819–1895), married Countess Juliana Batthyány von Németújvár
- Mathilde, Countess of Montenuovo (1822–1823)
- Gustav, Count of Montenuovo (1823-?), who died young

Napoleon died on 5 May 1821. On 8 August, Marie Louise married Neipperg morganatically. Neipperg died of heart problems on 22 February 1829, devastating Marie Louise. She was banned by Austria from mourning in public. To replace Neipperg, Austria appointed Josef von Werklein as Grand Chamberlain.

Marie Louise's son by Napoleon, then known as "Franz", was given the title Duke of Reichstadt in 1818. Franz lived at the Austrian court, where he was shown great affection by his grandfather, but was constantly undermined by Austrian ministers and nationalists, who did their best to sideline him to become an irrelevance. There were fears that he might be smuggled over to France to regain the throne, as he could be easily disguised as a girl. Franz grew resentful at his Austrian relatives and his mother for their lack of support, and began identifying as Napoleon II and surrounding himself with French courtiers. The relationship with his mother broke down when he became aware that his mother had borne two illegitimate children to Neipperg prior to their marriage; this occurred to such an extent that he once remarked "If Josephine had been my mother, my father would not have been buried at Saint Helena, and I should not be at Vienna. My mother is kind but weak; she was not the wife my father deserved; Josephine was." However, before anything could become of Napoleon II, he died at the age of 21 in Vienna in 1832, after suffering from tuberculosis.

1831 saw the outbreak of the Carbonari-led uprisings in Italy. In Parma, protesters gathered in the streets to denounce Grand Chamberlain Werklein. Marie Louise did not know what to do and wanted to leave the city, but was prevented from doing so by the protesters, who saw her as someone who would listen to their demands. She managed to leave Parma between 14 and 15 February, and the rebels formed a provisional government, led by Count Filippo Luigi Linati. At Piacenza, she wrote to her father, asking him to replace Werklein. Francis sent in Austrian troops, which crushed the rebellion. To avoid further turmoil, Marie Louise granted amnesty to the dissidents on 29 September.

To replace Werklein, in 1833, Metternich sent Charles-René de Bombelles, a French émigré nobleman who had served in the Austrian army against Napoleon. Bombelles was an excellent Grand Chamberlain, who thoroughly reformed the finances of the duchy. A middle-aged widower, he also developed a close personal relationship with Marie Louise. Six months after his arrival, on 17 February 1834, she married him, again morganatically.

== Death ==
Marie Louise fell ill on 9 December 1847. Her condition worsened for the next few days. On 17 December, she passed out after vomiting and never woke up again. She died in the evening. The cause of death was determined to be pleurisy.

Her body was transferred back to Vienna and buried at the Imperial Crypt.

== Arms ==
Marital arms of Empress Marie Louise	Monogram of Marie Louise	Arms as Duchess of Parma

Her arms as Duchess of Parma are used as the logo of the perfume company Acqua di Parma. This is in homage to the role she played in helping to develop the perfume and glass industry of Parma.

== Gallery ==
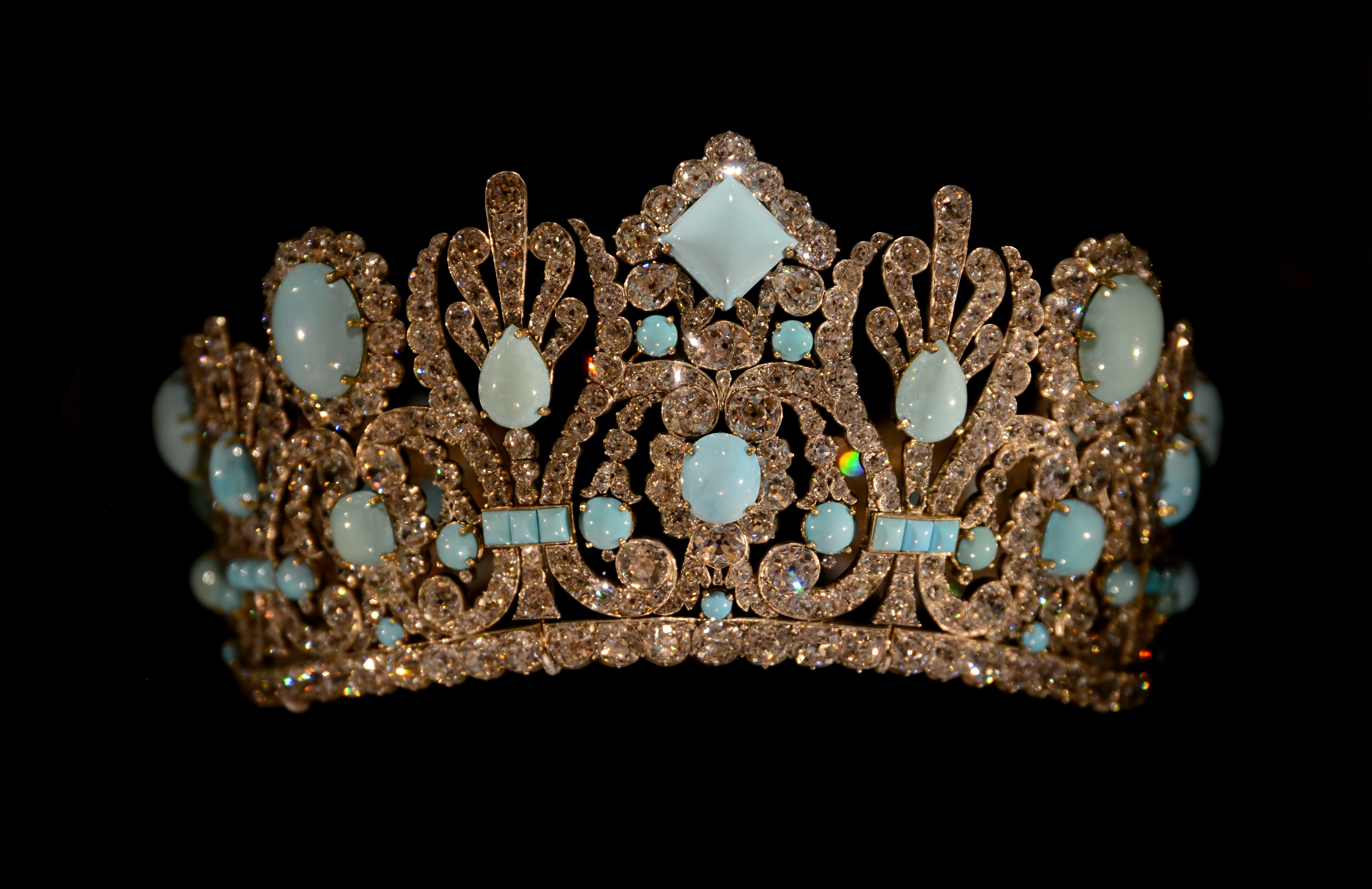
Crown of Empress Marie Louise, set in silver, the 950 diamonds weigh 700 carats, the 79 original emeralds have been replaced with Persian turquoise cabochons

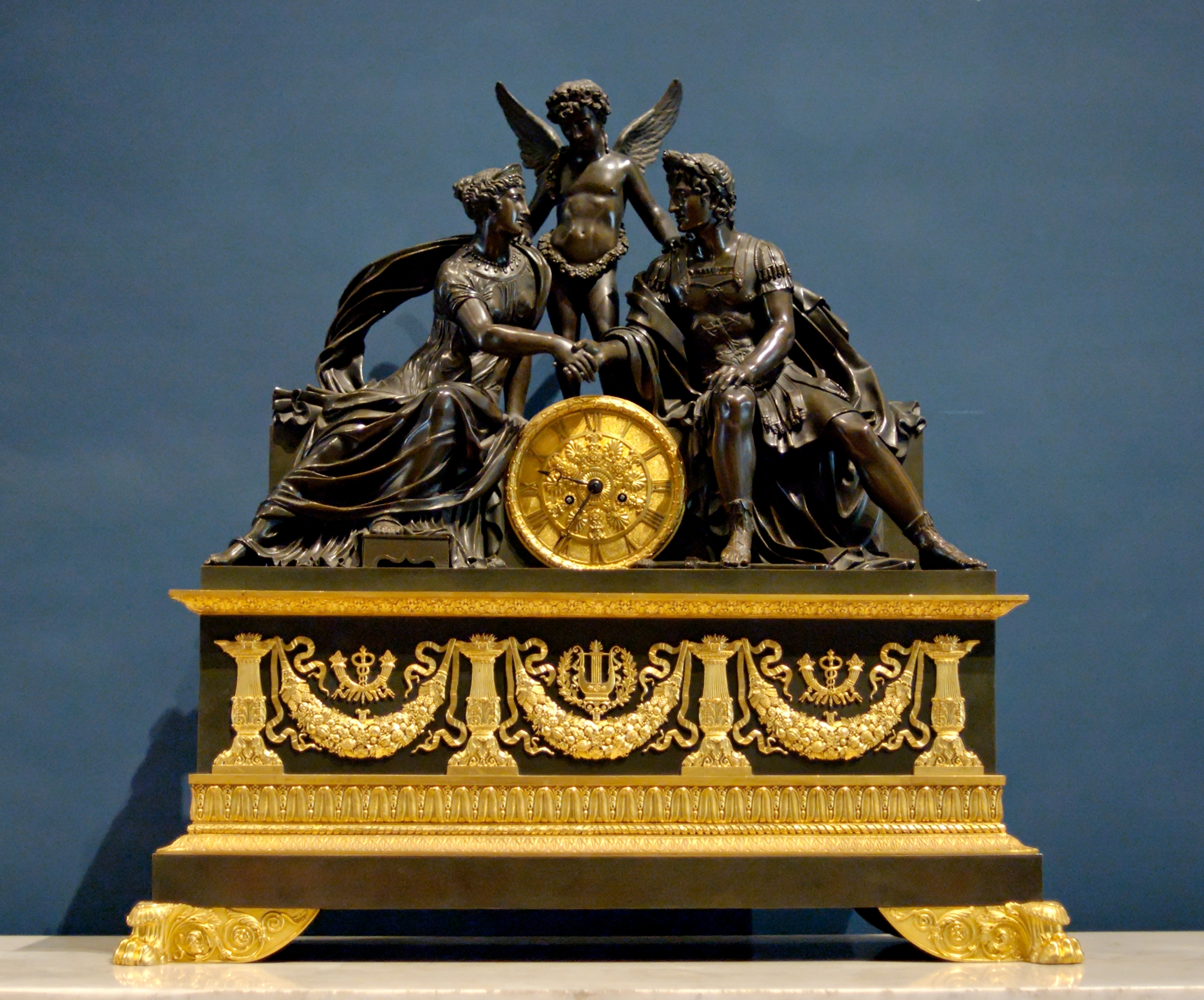
A French Empire mantel clock representing Mars and Venus, an allegory of the wedding of Napoleon I and the Archduchess Marie Louise, c.1810

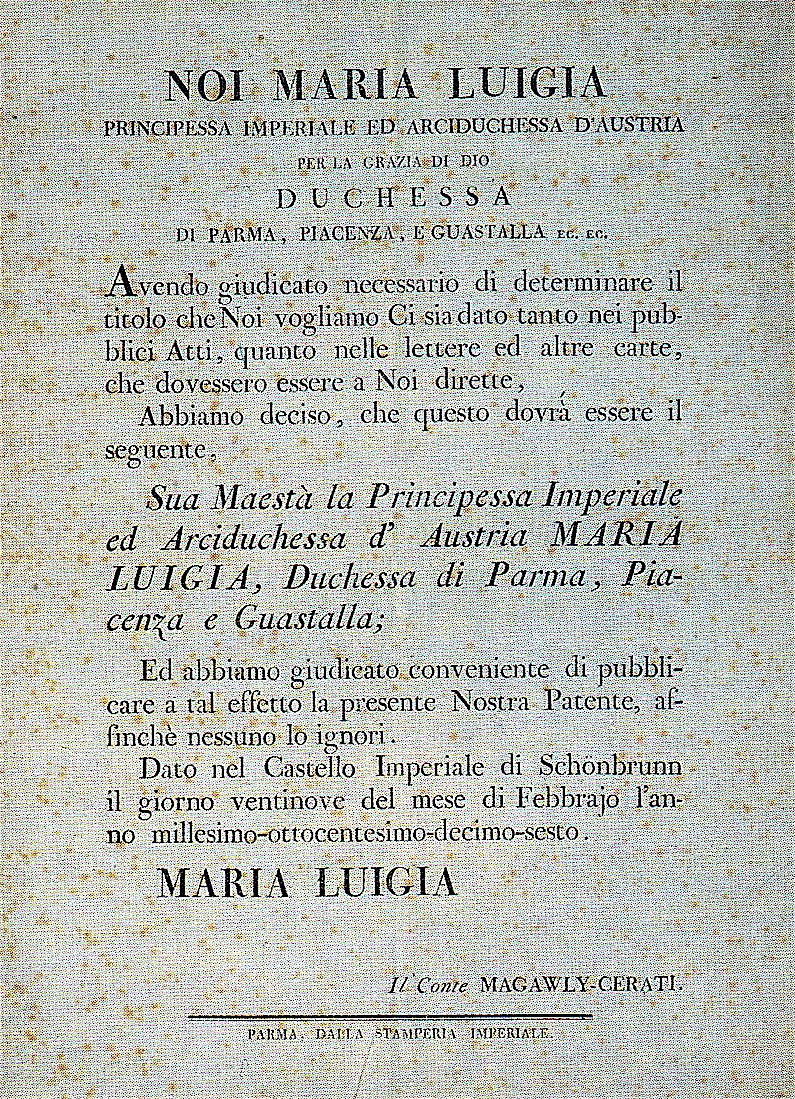
Decree with which Marie Louise Italianized her name as Maria Luigia

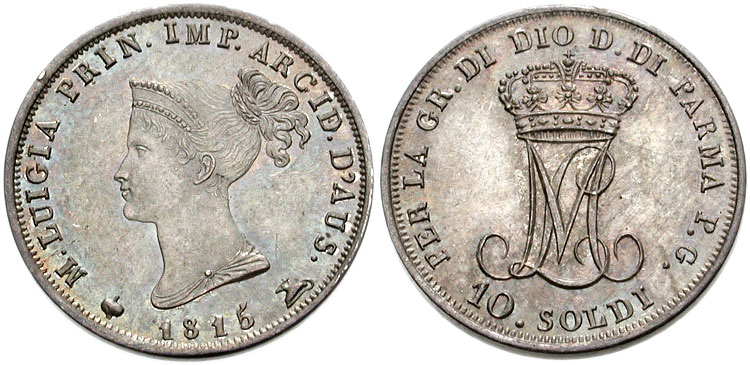
Ten soldi coin of Parma, 1815, bearing the head of Marie Louise on the obverse and her "ML" monogram on the reverse

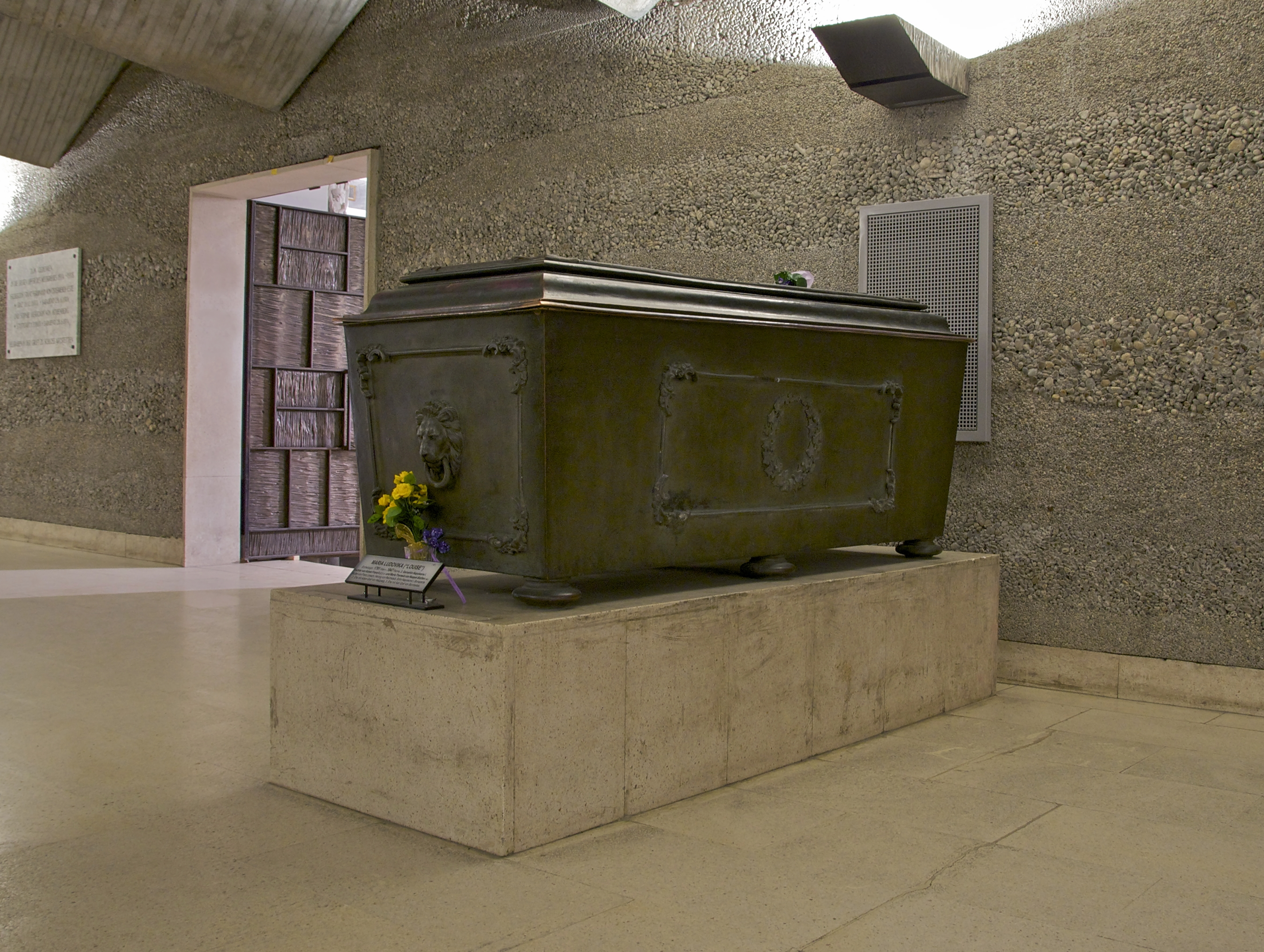
Sarcophagus of Marie Louise in the Imperial Crypt, Vienna

== Ancestry ==
Ancestors of Marie Louise, Duchess of Parma

8. Francis I, Holy Roman Emperor (= 14)
4. Leopold II, Holy Roman Emperor
9. Maria Theresa, Queen of Hungary (= 15)
2. Francis II, Holy Roman Emperor
10. Charles III, King of Spain (= 12)
5. Maria Luisa of Spain
11. Maria Amalia of Saxony (= 13)
1. Marie Louise, Duchess of Parma
12. Charles III, King of Spain (= 10)
6. Ferdinand I, King of the Two Sicilies
13. Maria Amalia of Saxony (= 11)
3. Maria Theresa of Naples and Sicily
14. Francis I, Holy Roman Emperor (= 8)
7. Maria Carolina of Austria
15. Maria Theresa, Queen of Hungary (= 9)

== See also ==
- Napoleon Diamond Necklace – Jewellery commissioned by Napoleon

== Notes ==
Marie Louise, Duchess of Parma House of Habsburg-Lorraine Cadet branch of the House of Lorraine Born: 12 December 1791 Died: 17 December 1847
Royal titles
Vacant Title last held by Joséphine de Beauharnais	Empress consort of the French; 1810–1814; 1815	Vacant Title next held by Marie Thérèse of France as Queen of France and Navarre
Vacant Title last held by Joséphine de Beauharnais	Queen consort of Italy; 1810–1814	Vacant Title next held by Margherita of Savoy
Regnal titles
Vacant First French Empire Title last held by Ferdinand	Duchess of Parma and Piacenza; 1814–1847	Succeeded by Charles II
Vacant First French Empire Title last held by Ferdinand	Duchess of Guastalla; 1814–1847	Succeeded by Francis
