= Cantata for the Wedding of Emperor Napoleon and Marie-Louise of Austria =

Wedding cantata by Johann Nepomuk Hummel

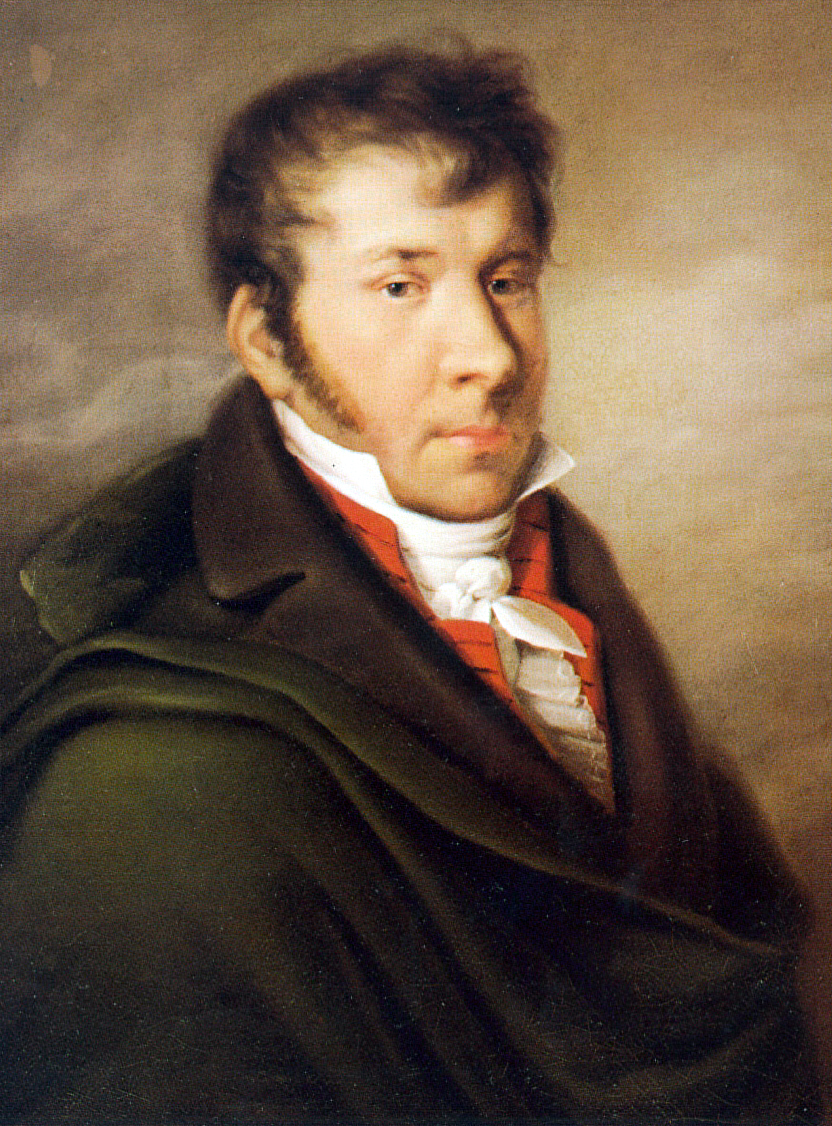
Johann Nepomuk Hummel, portrait by Joseph Willibrord Mähler, c. 1814

Cantate pour le Mariage de l'Empereur Napoleon avec Marie Louise d'Autriche (Cantata for the Wedding of Emperor Napoleon and Marie Louise of Austria) is a wedding cantata for orchestra, choir and soloists composed by Johann Nepomuk Hummel in 1810. The piece was performed at the wedding ceremony of Napoleon Bonaparte and Marie Louise of Austria in March, but was not published in the composer's lifetime. It received a first performance in the UK in 2016, with instrumentalists and singers from Clare College, Cambridge conducted by Toby Hession.

== Form ==
The work lasts approximately 35 minutes and consists of 22 movements in total.

1. Introduction (Orchestra only)
2. Chœur Général (Orchestra with choir)
3. Récitatif (Bass)
4. Récitatif (Bass)
5. Duo (Soprano and Tenor)
6. Quatour (Soprano, Mezzo-Soprano, Tenor, Bass)
7. Récitatif (Soprano)
8. Chœur Général
9. Récitatif (Soprano and Tenor)
10. Quatour sans instruments (unaccompanied Soprano, Mezzo-Soprano, Tenor, Bass)
11. Récitatif (Tenor and Bass)
12. Duo (Soprano and Tenor)
13. Chœur Général
14. Air (Tenor)
15. Récitatif (Mezzo-Soprano)
16. Romance (Soprano)
17. Chœur Général
18. Récitatif (Tenor and Bass)
19. Chœur Général
20. Récitatif (Tenor and Bass)
21. Quatour (Soprano, Mezzo-Soprano, Tenor, Bass)
22. Chœur Général

== Instrumentation ==
The work is scored for a standard classical orchestra of strings, double woodwind, horns and timpani, along with double choir and four solo singers: a soprano, a mezzo-soprano, a tenor and a bass.

The second movement is set for double choir; in the original performance, the first choir consisted of French singers and the second of Austrian singers. Similarly, the Soprano and Tenor soloists were French, and the Mezzo-Soprano and Bass soloists were Austrian.
