= Quintigny =

Commune in Bourgogne-Franche-Comté, France

- Commune
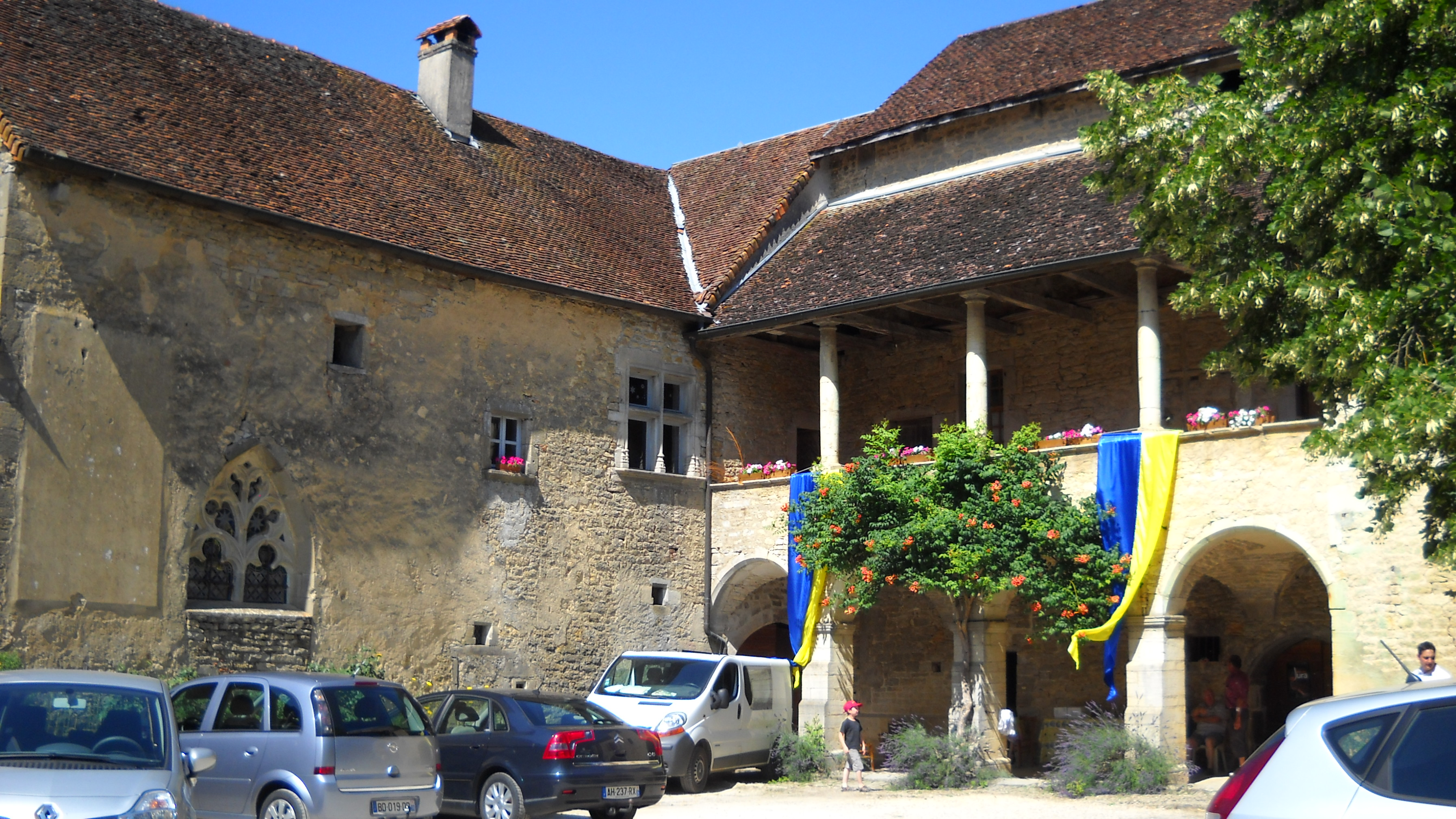
- Chateau

- Coat of arms
- Location of Quintigny
- Location within France Location within Bourgogne-Franche-Comté
- Coordinates: 46°44′06″N 5°31′34″E
- Country: France
- Region: Bourgogne-Franche-Comté
- Department: Jura
- Arrondissement: Lons-le-Saunier
- Canton: Bletterans

Government
  - Mayor (2020–2026): Jean-Paul Martin
- Area^{1}: 3.65 km^{2} (1.41 sq mi)
- Highest elevation: 395 m (1,296 ft)
- Lowest elevation: 212 m (696 ft)
- Population (2023): 308
  - Density: 84.4/km^{2} (219/sq mi)
- Time zone: UTC+01:00 (CET)
  - Summer (DST): UTC+02:00 (CEST)
- INSEE/Postal code: 39447 /39570
- ^{1} French Land Register data, which excludes lakes, ponds, glaciers > 1 km^{2} (0.386 sq mi or 247 acres) and river estuaries.

Quintigny (French pronunciation: [kɛ̃tiɲi]) is a commune in the Jura department in Bourgogne-Franche-Comté in eastern France.

== Population ==
Historical population
Year	Pop.	±% p.a.
1968	136	—
1975	129	−0.75%
1982	168	+3.85%
1990	180	+0.87%
1999	201	+1.23%
2007	226	+1.48%
2012	215	−0.99%
2017	248	+2.90%
2023	308	+3.68%
Source: INSEE

== See also ==
- Communes of the Jura department
- L'Étoile AOC
