= Pierre-Maurice Quays =

French painter (1777–1803)

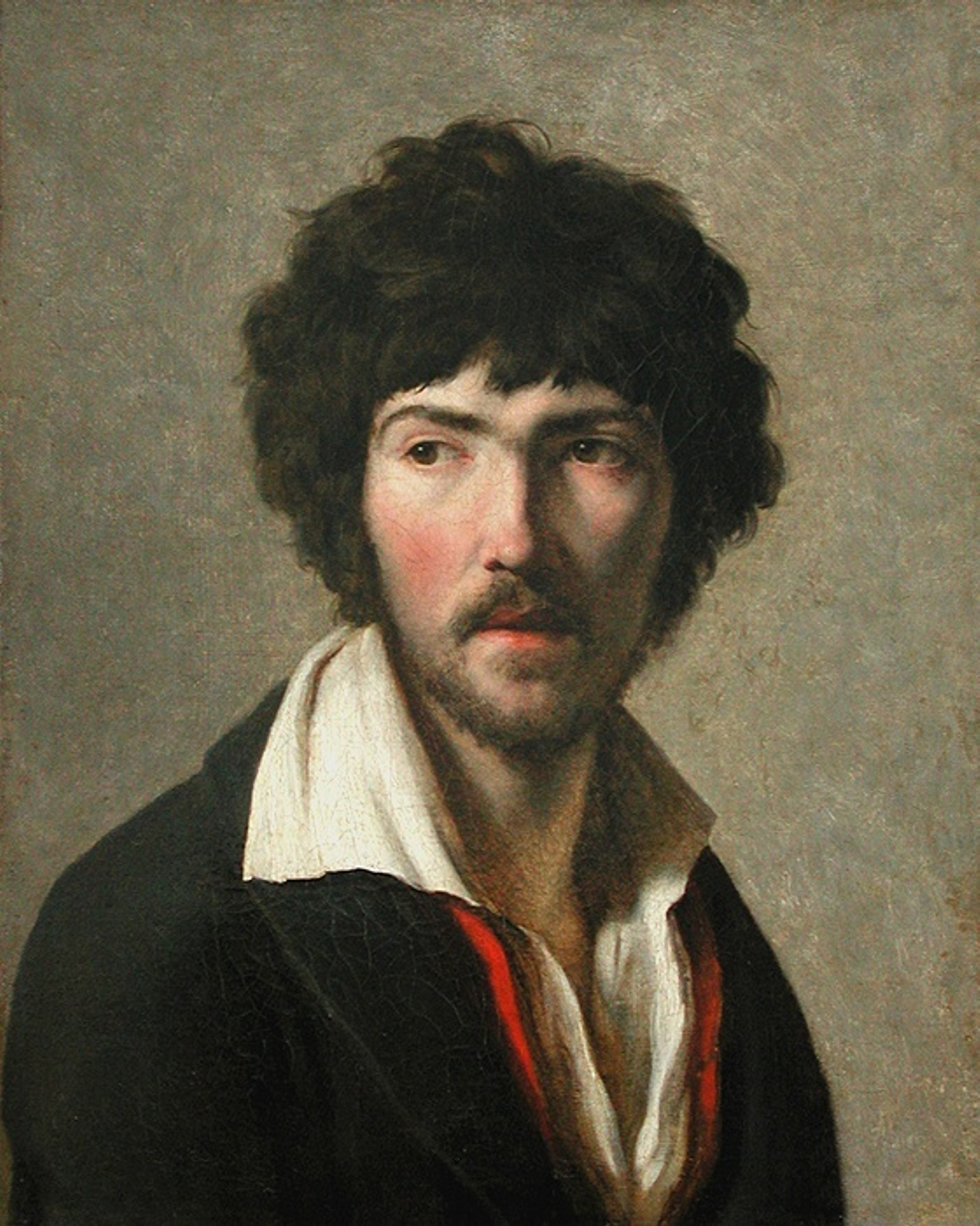
Pierre-Maurice Quays, by Henri-François Riesener (c.1798)

Pierre-Maurice Quays, Quay or Quaï (5 January 1777 – 5 September 1803) was a French Neoclassical painter. He is generally credited with coining the term "Rococo".

== Biography ==
He was born in Paris. He was a student of Jacques-Louis David, and while at his workshop, he founded a group known as the Secte des Barbus (Bearded Sect), or the "Primitives", devoted to criticizing the prevailing styles and promoting a more basic approach. At its height, it had about sixty members. Jean-Pierre Franque, David's assistant, was dismissed for allowing the group to meet in his room at the studio. In 1800, Quays and all of the group's members, even David's students, were banned from entering the studio, due to their harsh public criticism of The Intervention of the Sabine Women.

His followers called him "Agamemnon" and he advocated a return to the simple lines of Ancient Greek pottery art. They were also vegetarians and often wore eccentric clothing, inspired by Greek costumes, which attracted mockery and insults. He died in Saint-Leu-La-Forêt of a lung disorder, most likely tuberculosis, at the age of twenty-six, and the group did not survive him.

According to Étienne-Jean Delécluze, the term "Rococo" was coined by Quays around 1797, as a humorous variation of the word "Rocaille". It was originally intended to deride a style radically opposed to his tastes.

Only one known painting of his survives; a male portrait known as Tête d'étude.
