= Pictures at an Exhibition (disambiguation) =

Pictures at an Exhibition is a suite of ten piano pieces composed by Modest Mussorgsky.

Pictures at an Exhibition may also refer to:

- Pictures at an Exhibition (Stokowski orchestration), a 1939 orchestration by Leopold Stokowski
- Pictures at an Exhibition (Emerson, Lake & Palmer album), a 1971 album by Emerson, Lake & Palmer
- Pictures at an Exhibition, a 1976 album by Isao Tomita
- Pictures at an Exhibition, a 1996 album by Mekong Delta
- Pictures at an Exhibition (film), a 1966 animated film by Osamu Tezuka
- Pictures at an Exhibition (Bilder einer Ausstellung) (TV film), a 1996 film by Ulrich Seidl
- "Pictures in an Exhibition", a song by Death Cab for Cutie from the 1997 album You Can Play These Songs with Chords
- Pictures at an Exhibition, a 2009 novel by Sara Houghteling
- Pictures at an Exhibition (ballet), a 2014 ballet by Alexei Ratmansky

== See also ==
- "Promenade (Satellite Pictures at an Exhibition)", a song from the 2014 Neil Cicierega mashup album Mouth Sounds
