= Sergei Gorchakov =

Russian composer

Sergei Petrovich Gorchakov (Russian: Сергей Петрович Горчаков; 10 February 1905 – 4 July 1976) was a Russian classical music composer. Gorchakov is best known for his uniquely 'Russian' orchestration of Pictures at an Exhibition by Modest Mussorgsky.
