= Gen Atem =

Swiss artist (born 1967)

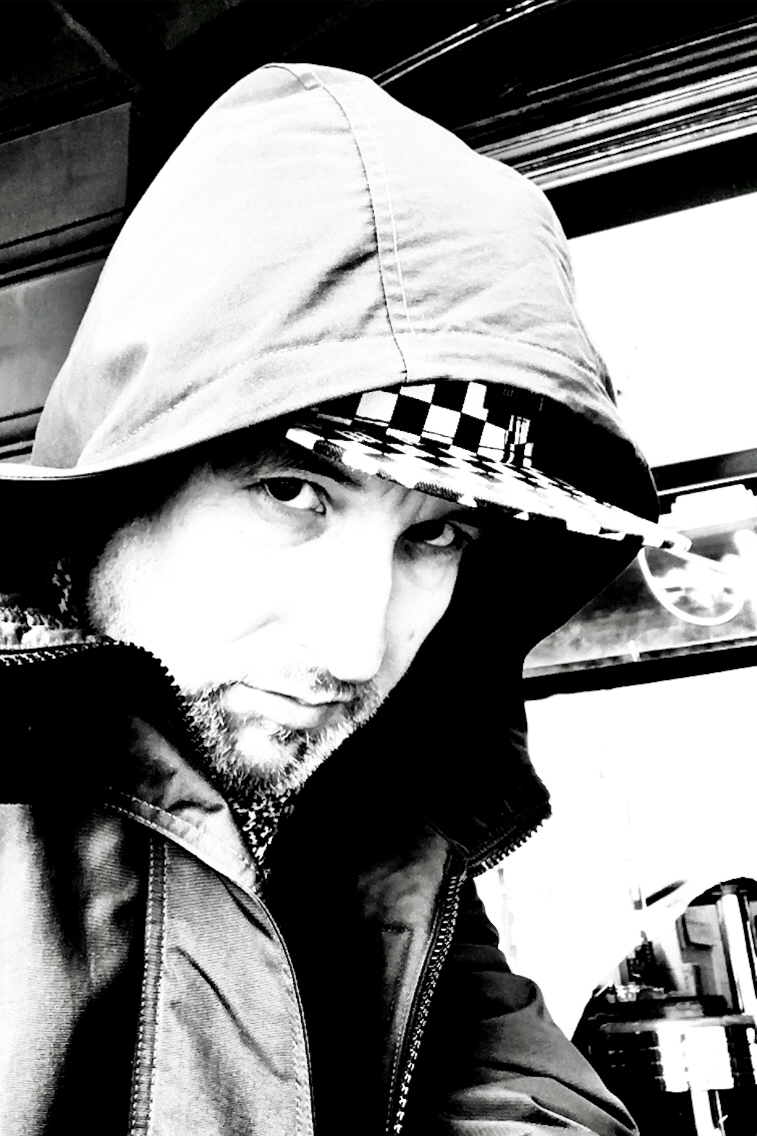
- Atem in 2020
- Born: Anton Wettstein; October 27, 1967 (age 58); Frauenfeld, Thurgau, Switzerland
- Other names: Gen U One, Gen One, Gen, Genius
- Occupations: Visual artist, performance artist, musician, and writer
- Spouse: Miriam Bossard Wettstein

Gen Atem (born Anton Wettstein; 1967) is a visual and performance artist, musician, writer, and Zen-master. He lives and works in Herbetswil, Switzerland.

== Life and career ==
Atem was born in Frauenfeld, Switzerland in 1967.

Gen Atem began painting on subway cars and walls in 1982 and is regarded as one of the pioneers of Europe's street art movement. He studied and graduated graphic design at the School of Visual Arts Zurich (today Zurich University of the Arts). From 1986 to 1994, he mainly lived in New York City, working as an artist. From 1994 to 2001, he studied Buddhist philosophy, practiced Buddhist meditation, and was ordained a Zen priest in 1999. Gen Atem is married to the artist and graphic designer Miriam Bossard. Since 2009 he is part of the artist duo Gen Atem / Miriam Bossard and their graphic design studio Bossard Wettstein GmbH in Herbetswil, Switzerland.

Since autumn 2025, Gen Atem (Anton Wettstein) has been the Vice Mayor of Herbetswil.

== Work ==
Gen Atem's work includes political graffiti and color attacks in public space, illegal works on subway cars and buildings, freely improvised painting actions, sculptures, paintings, art performances, musical compositions, and literature. His visual art works have been exhibited in museums and galleries in New York City, Paris, Amsterdam, Berlin, Zurich, Bregenz, Istanbul, and Tokyo. Some of his works are in public collections.

On the occasion of the Urban art biennial 2024, Gen Atem, together with Miriam Bossard, created a political graffiti performance at the UNESCO World Heritage site “Völklingen Ironworks.” Using fist-sized pieces of coal, he wrote 3–5 meter tall letters in a circle around a building, forming the sentence loop “…always further to the right and always further to the right and…”. In doing so, he addressed and criticized political movements that are increasingly shifting to the right. Miriam Bossard, on the other hand, took on the role of the denier of history: she continuously wiped away the writing and attempted to erase this history by pouring buckets of water over it. Finally, a forensic expert secured traces of the remaining coal dust. From this dust, Gen Atem and Miriam Bossard created a paint emulsion, with which they painted a large black dot on a column of the Historical Museum at the UNESCO World Heritage site “Völklinger Ironworks.” The dot serves as a lasting memorial: it symbolizes the missing period in the endless sentence loop and is meant to put an end to the rightward drift. The art action was documented in the book Always Right, with the foreword written by Swiss Councilor Franziska Roth.

Commissioned by Dieter Kägi, Gen Atem conceived, choreographed and produced, together with the artist S213, a multi-media opera to the musical composition Pictures at an Exhibition by Modest Mussorgsky in the version by Maurice Ravel. It was premiered on September 2, 2021 together with the Biel Solothurn Symphony Orchestra conducted by Kaspar Zehnder. While Mussorgsky’s composition was based on pictures by the artist Viktor Hartmann the two artists Gen Atem and S213 reversed the process and created a visual and multi-media work to the music of Mussorgsky. The result is a work that combines classical music and the various elements of Hip hop such as graffiti, scratching and breakdancing.

=== Political graffiti and paint bomb attacks ===
During the period of riots after the Opernhauskrawalle in Zurich at the beginning of the 1980s, Gen Atem sprayed socially critical illustrations and graffiti in public space in Zurich, and carried out politically motivated color attacks on official buildings. Since then he has repeatedly applied the throwing of paint bombs in his artistic work.

=== Graffiti and street art ===
In 1982, Gen Atem became aware of the hip-hop culture and began his activities as a breakdancer, DJ, and graffiti writer under the artist names Genius, Gen, Gen One, and Gen U One. From 1982 to 1992, he created over 800 works in public spaces in New York, Paris, Amsterdam, Berlin, Basel, and Zurich. He not only used the spray can, but also experimented with paint rollers, paint bombs, powder pigments, and waste objects, which he integrated into his works with adhesive materials. He was the founder and leader of the graffiti crews "Wild Writers" and "Attacking Vandalism Criminals" (or simply AVC). Due to his activities as a graffiti writer, he was arrested several times. After his first son was born in 1992, he withdrew from such illegal actions. Together with the artist S213 Werne Feller, in 2017, he created a large mural of over 10,000 square feet at the Attisholz-Areal in Solothurn. It is titled "Christoph Blocher" and depicts a portrait of the Swiss politician of the same name, attacked with a color bomb. At the time of its creation, the mural was considered the largest in Switzerland.

=== Freely improvised painting ===
In the 1980s Gen Atem collaborated with musicians in the field of free improvisation music, with the claim that painters and musicians inspire each other in their live improvised work. In 1989, he organized a series of performances at the Kunsthaus Oerlikon in Zurich, in which he worked together with musicians such as Stephan Wittwer, Irène Schweizer, and Christy Doran. For this new kind of action art, he coined the term "Frei Improvisierte Malerei" (Freely Improvised Painting) combining elements of the Viennese Actionists, Abstract Expressionism, and Graffiti.

=== Futurism and performances ===
From 1986 to 1994, Gen Atem collaborated with the New York artist Rammellzee, who interlaced graffiti with elements of Afrofuturism in his work, which he called Ikonoklast Panzerism – Gothic Futurism. Together with Rammellzee, Gen Atem realized various performances and exhibitions in New York City and Amsterdam between 1986 and 1994. Gen Atem and Rammellzee organized and executed so-called "art battle performances", like the one at Eigen+Art Gallery in New York City in 1994, titled "Exercises in Self Presentation". For these art battles, each artist created 26 sculptures, each of which represented one of the letters of the alphabet. A chassis with wheels was an integral part of each sculpture, and the two artists had their letters compete with each other in combinations of so-called "letter formation functions" on a system of self-made tracks. Simultaneously, Gen Atem and Rammellzee played self-composed music and attacked each other with rhymes. Inspired by Afrofuturism, Gen Atem used language, his mobile letter sculptures, and his vocal music performances as a strategy and technology to transcend the digital divide. He created and performed in costumes similar to those worn by Sun Ra and Parliament-Funkadelic.

=== Buddhist philosophy and meditation ===
In 1994, Gen Atem and Rammellzee ended their collaboration. Gen Atem became more interested in Asian calligraphy and Buddhist philosophy, and retired to a Buddhist monastery in 1995. In 1999, he was ordained a monk and studied Buddhist philosophy of the Tibetan tradition under the guidance of the 14th Dalai Lama. Afterwards he studied and practiced under the guidance of the Vietnamese Zen master Thích Nhất Hạnh in the Zen-monastery Plum Village in France. From 2001 to 2009 he was head of the "Four Seasons Meditation Centre" in Zurich and taught Buddhist philosophy and meditation. His teachings were recorded by his students and published in the book "Gen Atem – The Four Noble Truths, an Introduction to Buddhism" in 2006.

=== Meditated Vandalism ===
During his time in the monastery, Gen Atem created calligraphic drawings in small formats. Since 2007 he has been painting larger works again, which he presents internationally in museums and galleries. In his works he combines the various art forms and the philosophical aspects associated with them and calls them "Meditated Vandalism". In the monograph on Gen Atem, art historian Rémi Jaccard writes in his essay "On Meditated Vandalism": "...Like Jackson Pollock and Hermann Nitsch, Gen Atem also comprehends the act of painting as a ritual in which energy is discharged and conserved in the form of a painting. And as with Francis Picabia, the result – the shapeless spot – symbolizes the resistance against norms and conventions...". In December 2016, the Neue Zürcher Zeitung published a comprehensive portrait of Gen Atem in both the print and online editions. In March 2013, SRF Schweizer Fernsehen broadcast a reportage on Gen Atem and his work.

=== Music ===
In the early 1990s Gen Atem started composing, producing, and performing music to co-play in his art-performances. During this time, he began working on his first solo album "The Subway Monk" which he composed and produced with Stephan Wittwer. Due to legal issues, the album was not released until 2019. Gen Atem (vocals, vocoder) and Stephan Wittwer (guitar) played two concerts at Rote Fabrik Aktionshalle and at "The Sihlquai Club" in Zurich with Wittwer's band "Sludge 2/3000" and another concert at Moods Club with Wittwer's band "Das T.E.A.M." in 1995 and 1996. In 2012 and 2013, Gen Atem was the singer of the group "Die Grenzwelt" and had appearances at the "blank city calling" art festival, at the Club Exil and at the Club Zukunft in Zurich. His second studio solo album "Not Here" was released in 2014, the third solo album "Truth" in 2020, and "Lost Tracks" as well as the single "Double Fight: Four More Rounds" in 2022 on the label Sunticrecords.

=== Writing and teaching ===
From 1990 to 1993, Gen Atem sporadically wrote art theoretical treatises in conjunction with sketches on the subject of "Ikonoklast Panzerism - Gothic Futurism" for the Zurich trend magazine Forecast. In 2015 and 2016, he published essays in the two books "Time Frame" and "Meditated Vandalism" in which he explains the commonality between Buddhist philosophy and his work as an artist.

== Collections ==
Gen Atem's works are represented in the following public collections:

- Historical Museum Baden, Baden, Switzerland: "The Subway Monk #1 and #2", 2 collages, mixed media, 10 by 27 inches each.
- Art collection of the Canton of Zurich, University of Zurich, Switzerland: "Time Frame", five paintings on steel objects, acrylic and ink, approx. 7 by 7 feet each.
- MoE Museum of Emptiness, St. Gallen, Switzerland: "Form is Emptiness", wall painting, chalk and acrylic, 6.5 by 13 feet, 2017.
- Campus Attisholz, Solothurn, Switzerland: "Christoph Blocher", wall painting, acrylic, over 10000 square feet.

== Exhibitions ==
Gen Atem presented his works in numerous solo exhibitions in museums and galleries in the USA, Europe, and Asia. In group exhibitions and art fairs, his paintings were presented alongside works of Miguel Berrocal, Ata Bosaci, David Choe, Peter Coffin, Dondi, Franz Fedier, Futura, Yuki Itoda, JonOne, Kaws, John Matos (Crash), Takashi Murakami, Phase 2, Rammellzee, Seen, Jeff Soto, and others.

== Bibliography (selection) ==
- 2018: Pretty Zeecity Retrospective, David Gartmann Verlag, ISBN 978-3-03306-760-8
- 2018: Schmieren / Kleben (from the archive KKIII of the Zurich City Police), Edition Patrick Frey, ISBN 978-390680-361-6
- 2016: Meditated Vandalism, Hatje Cantz Publishing, ISBN 978-377574-183-5
- 2016: ZeeCity, Otmar Maag Migel und M.O.D.-Verlag, ISBN 978-303304-603-0
- 2016: 101 Contemporary Artists, ArtVoices Art Books, ISBN 978-069265-082-0
- 2015: Time Frame, Art Collection Canton Zurich, Bossard Wettstein Publishing, ISBN 978-303305-280-2
- 2015: Abstract Vandalism, Unruly Publishing, ISBN 978-908234-070-9
- 2012: One by One, Guangzhou Sendpoints Books, ISBN 978-398145-570-0
- 2006: Die Vier Edlen Wahrheiten, Vier Jahreszeiten Verlag, ISBN 978-303300-610-2
- 1999: Swiss Graffiti, Aragon Verlag, ISBN 978-389535-461-8
- 1995: Anarchie und Aerosol, Aragon Verlag, ISBN 978-389535-450-2

== Discography ==
=== Studio albums ===
Year	Album title	Artist(s)	Notes
2014	Not here	Gen Atem	
2017	The Subway Monk	Gen Atem	
2020	Truth	Gen Atem	
2022	Lost Tracks	Gen Atem	
