= Thomas Wilbrandt =

German composer and conductor (born 1952)

- Born: June 3, 1952 (age 73); Bielefeld, Germany
- Occupations: Composer and conductor

Thomas Wilbrandt (born in 1952) is a German composer and conductor. He is known for Natural Born Killers (1994), Vaters Land (1986), and Perlasca (1993).

== Education ==
Wilbrandt studied with Franco Ferrara, Hans Swarowsky, and Bruno Maderna in the cities of Rome, Vienna, and Salzburg. Additionally, Wilbrandt worked in Berlin for about three years for both Herbert von Karajan and the Berlin Philharmonic.

== Career ==
In 1980, Wilbrandt founded the Berlin Chamber Academy (Berliner Kammer-Akademie), a forty-piece orchestra originally formed from players of the Berlin Philharmonic with whom he recorded a Mozart Series for RCA Victor.

Alongside international conducting activities and collaborations with orchestras such as the Berlin Philharmonic and the Philharmonia Orchestra in London, Wilbrandt became increasingly focused on his own musical projects and recordings. His personal works were focused particularly in the fields of avant-garde and electronic music, which led to experimentation with multimedia content and new forms of musical presentation.

One of Wilbrandt's first major projects was the creation of a fusion of acoustic orchestral playing, digital and electronic instruments, and sounds entitled "THE ELECTRIC V", which was an approach to Vivaldi's concert cycle The Four Seasons. The first edition of "THE ELECTRIC V" was released in 1984 in twenty countries. Wilbrandt wrote, directed, and produced "The Electric V." between the years of 1987 and 1990, which was released exclusively on CD-Video.

Wilbrandt contributed music to the soundtrack of Oliver Stone's film Natural Born Killers.

== Works and releases (selection) ==
- The Mozart Series, Berliner-Kammer-Akademie. Conducted by Thomas Wilbrandt. RCA/VICTOR (1981-1989)
- The Electric V. – A New Perspective on Vivaldi's Four Seasons (1984), Philharmonia Orchestra. Christopher Warren-Green, solo-violin. Created, arranged, and conducted by Thomas Wilbrandt. Mercury 818 147-2 (1984) Decca 425 205-2 (1988) Thamos 37501 (1999)
- Antonio Vivaldi, The Four Seasons, Philharmonia Orchestra. Conducted by Thomas Wilbrandt. Solo-violin Christopher Warren-Green. Philips 412 321 (1984)
- Transforming V. – Variations on Vivaldi, Royal Philharmonic Orchestra. Created, arranged, and conducted by Thomas Wilbrandt. Decca 425 211 (1990)
- Erik Satie, Alone, for a second, Modern Sinfonietta. Created, arranged, and conducted by Thomas Wilbrandt. Decca 425 226 (1991)
- Modest P. Mussorgsky, Pictures at an Exhibition, Modern Sinfonietta. Orchestrated, arranged, and conducted by Thomas Wilbrandt. Decca 436 717 (1993)
- Mussorgsky/Wilbrandt, Exhibitionistic Echoes (from Pictures at an Exhibition). A reworking for acoustic instruments and electronic delays Modern Sinfonietta. Decca 436 717 (1993)
- Thomas Wilbrandt, Mono Tones – 12 Studies in Silence, for one and two pianos. Decca 440 228 (1993)
- The Electric V. The Four Seasons Variations (Film c. 92 mins). Created, filmed, produced, and directed by Thomas Wilbrandt. Decca/Universal (1990) LD-Video 071 117

== Performances ==
- Alone, for a Second, choreography by Nacho Duato, Netherlands Dans Theater (1993) / Compania Nacional de Danza de España, Seville (2002)
- Interlaced, choreography by Lynn Coit, ballet set to The Electric V, The Washington Ballet (1996)
- Anotimpuri (Seasons), choreography by Sergiu Anghel, ballet for 12 dancers set to "The Electric V.", Orion Ballet Company (1998)
- Sea of My Soul, choreography by Patrick Corbin, Company C Contemporary Ballet, San Francisco (2007)
