= Leonidas Leonardi =

Leonidas Leonardi (Леонидас Леонарди) (27 July 1901, Moscow – 1 March 1967, New York) was an American composer and pianist of Russian origin.

== Biography ==
He studied in Paris under Maurice Ravel. In his youth, he recorded several piano rolls for the Welte and Pleyela companies (including Ravel's Pavane pour une infante défunte and pieces by Liszt, Rachmaninoff, Arensky, and Grieg).

He is best known for several orchestrations—specifically of Rachmaninoff's "Georgian Song" Op 4 no. IV ("Sing not, O lovely one, in my presence...") and, above all, Modest Mussorgsky's Pictures at an Exhibition.

Leonardi created his orchestration of Pictures at an Exhibition in 1924, just two years after his teacher Ravel had produced his own version for the Sergei Koussevitzky Orchestra. The need for a new orchestration was purely practical: Koussevitzky held exclusive performance rights to Ravel's version, so the heirs of the music publisher Bessel—the work's original publisher—commissioned an alternative version from Leonardi. Leonardi's arrangement was more avant-garde in nature, calling for an orchestra that included 60 string instruments, a large wind section (including three saxophones), and an extensive percussion section; the score was dedicated to Igor Stravinsky. The Orchestre Lamoureux gave the premiere performance of the arrangement, conducted by Leonardi himself.
