= Pictures at an Exhibition (film) =

Japanese animated film produced in 1966 by Osamu Tezuka

展覧会の絵 (Tenrankai no E)
- Genre: Experimental film
- Anime film
- Directed by: Osamu Tezuka
- Written by: Osamu Tezuka
- Music by: Modest Moussorgski; Isao Tomita
- Studio: Mushi Production
- Released: 11 November 1966

Pictures at an Exhibition (展覧会の絵, Tenrankai no E) is an animated film consisting of ten Japanese shorts. It was produced in 1966 by Osamu Tezuka and his studio Mushi Production. It received positive reviews upon its release as an avant-garde 37-minute film.

== Concept ==
Pictures at an Exhibition is an experimental film composed of ten independent short films that illustrate the ten movements of the eponymous music by Modest Mussorgsky (originally a piano suite from 1874). However, the music was arranged by Isao Tomita. Each sequence presents a satire, sometimes dramatic, of the shortcomings of modern society for Tezuka, such as money, superficiality, and pride. Although no words are spoken, the artistic style of the short films varies greatly from one to the next. Ultimately, the film is an homage to Disney's Fantasia, which was released in 1940 and has a very similar concept.

== Summaries of the short films ==
The film opens with a live-action sequence of a museum displaying caricatures, leading into the following ten short films:

Journalist (The Gnome)
Depicts the work of an unscrupulous critic and scandalous journalist;

Gardener of the Artificial Landscape (The Old Castle)
Portrays the agony of an insect lost in a sumptuous but artificial garden, amidst a megalopolis;

Cosmetic Surgeon (Tuileries)
Follows a surgeon who reshapes women, but whose face is destroyed in the end;

Big Factory Proprietor (Oxcart)
Shows an unscrupulous boss who gradually exploits and replaces his employees with machines, before becoming a victim of fate's irony;

Beatnik (Ballet of Unhatched Chicks)
Portrays the chaotic relationships between red and yellow chicks;

Boxer (Samuel Goldenberg & Schmuyle)
Depicts the rise and fall of a boxing elephant, a victim of his success and vanity;

Tv Talent (Limoges)
Shows a commercial filming by a diva;

Zen Priest (Catacombs)
A caricature of this art;

Soldiers (Baba Yaga)
Presents war through a succession of fireworks, then takes the viewpoint of a sick woman, bedridden in a hut near the battlefield;

Allegorical Conclusion (The Great Gate in the Capital of Kiev)
An allegory of paradise, where all the characters seen previously pass under an ancient triumphal arch and disappear. Only the arch remains, with its animated engravings of humble and unassuming men and women.

== Reception ==
Pictures at an Exhibition was released in Japan on 11 November 1966, during the Mushi Production festival. It was praised by critics and earned several awards for Tezuka, including the Ōfuji Noburō Award, the Best Animated Film Award at the Asia-Pacific Film Festival, and the Blue Ribbon Awards, all in 1967.

The film was also screened in France in 2006, along with other avant-garde works by Tezuka such as Tales of the Street Corner.

== Technical details ==
- Origin: Japan
- Duration: 37 minutes

=== Production ===
- Director: Osamu Tezuka
- Music: Modeste Moussorgski (arranged by Isao Tomita)
- Art director: Nagahara Tatsuya
- Studio: Mushi Production

== Sources and references ==
1. Onoda Power, Natsu (2009). God of comics : Osamu Tezuka and the creation of post-World War II manga (1st ed.). Jackson: Univ. Press of Mississippi. pp. 136–137. ISBN 978-1-60473-221-4. LCCN 2008046691.
2. McCarthy, Helen; Clements, Jonathan (2001). The Anime Encyclopedia : A Guide to Japanese Animation Since 1917. Berkeley: Titan Books Ltd. p. 489. ISBN 978-1-84576-500-2. LCCN 2006028265.
3. Patten, Fred (2004). Watching anime, reading manga : 25 years of essays and reviews. Berkeley: Stone Bridge Press. pp. 112, 148. ISBN 978-1-880656-92-1. LCCN 2004014856.
4. "About Tezuka Osamu, History, 1960s". tezukaosamu.net. Archived from the original on 16 July 2011.
5. "Pictures at an Exhibition". tezukaosamu.net.
6. "Tableaux d'une exposition". Les Films du Paradoxe. Archived from the original on 19 June 2009.
