= Pictures at an Exhibition =

1874 piano suite by Modest Mussorgsky

- Suite by Modest Mussorgsky
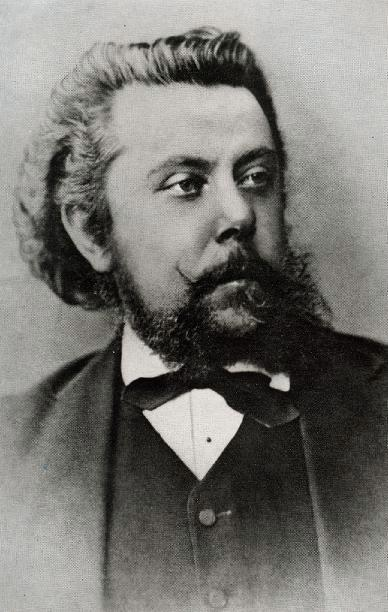
- Mussorgsky in 1874
- Native name: Картинки с выставки
- Based on: An exhibition of Viktor Hartmann's pictures
- Composed: 2–22 June 1874
- Dedication: Vladimir Stasov
- Published: 1886
- Duration: c. 35 minutes
- Movements: 10, plus a recurring, varied Promenade theme
- Scoring: Solo piano

Pictures at an Exhibition is a piano suite in ten movements, plus a recurring and varied Promenade theme, written in 1874, by Russian composer Modest Mussorgsky. It is a musical depiction of a tour of an exhibition of works by architect and painter Viktor Hartmann put on at the Imperial Academy of Arts in Saint Petersburg, following his sudden death in the previous year. Each movement of the suite is based on an individual work, some of which are lost.

The composition has become a showpiece for virtuoso pianists, and became widely known from orchestrations and arrangements produced by other composers and contemporary musicians, with Maurice Ravel's 1922 adaptation for orchestra being the most widely recorded and performed. The suite, particularly the final movement, "The Great Gate of Kiev", is widely considered one of Mussorgsky's greatest works.

== Composition history ==
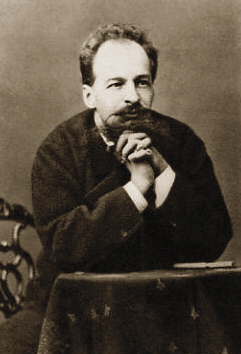
Viktor Hartmann (1834–1873)

The composition is based on pictures by the artist, architect, and designer Viktor Hartmann. It was probably in 1868 that Mussorgsky first met Hartmann, not long after the latter's return to Russia from abroad. Both men were devoted to the cause of an intrinsically Russian art and quickly became friends. They likely met in the home of the influential critic Vladimir Stasov, who followed both of their careers with interest. According to Stasov's testimony, in 1868, Hartmann gave Mussorgsky two of the pictures that later formed the basis of Pictures at an Exhibition. In 1870, Mussorgsky dedicated the second song ("In the Corner") of the cycle The Nursery to Hartmann. Stasov remarked that Hartmann loved Mussorgsky's compositions, and particularly liked the "Scene by the Fountain" in his opera Boris Godunov. Mussorgsky had abandoned the scene in his original 1869 version, but at the requests of Stasov and Hartmann, he reworked it for Act 3 in his revision of 1872.

The years 1873–74 are associated with the staging of Boris Godunov, the zenith of Mussorgsky's career as a composer—at least from the standpoint of public acclaim. Mussorgsky's distant relative, friend, and roommate during this period, Arseniy Golenishchev-Kutuzov, describing the January 1874 premiere of the opera, remarked: "During the winter, there were, I think, nine performances, and each time the theatre was sold out, each time the public tumultuously called for Mussorgsky." The composer's victory, however, was overshadowed by the hostile press he received from critics. Other circumstances conspired to dampen Mussorgsky's spirits. The disintegration of The Mighty Handful and their failure to understand his artistic goals contributed to the isolation he experienced as an outsider in Saint Petersburg's musical establishment. Golenishchev-Kutuzov wrote: "[The Mighty Handful's] banner was held by Mussorgsky alone; all the other members had left it and pursued his own path ..."

Hartmann's sudden death on 4 August 1873 from an aneurysm shook Mussorgsky along with others in Russia's art world. The loss of the artist, aged only 39, plunged the composer into deep despair. Stasov helped to organize a memorial exhibition of over 400 Hartmann works in the Imperial Academy of Arts in Saint Petersburg in February and March 1874. Mussorgsky lent to the exhibition the two pictures Hartmann had given him, and viewed the show in person. Later in June, two-thirds of the way through composing his song cycle Sunless, Mussorgsky was inspired to compose Pictures at an Exhibition, quickly completing the score in three weeks (2–22 June 1874). In a letter to Stasov (see photo), probably written on 12 June 1874, he describes his progress:

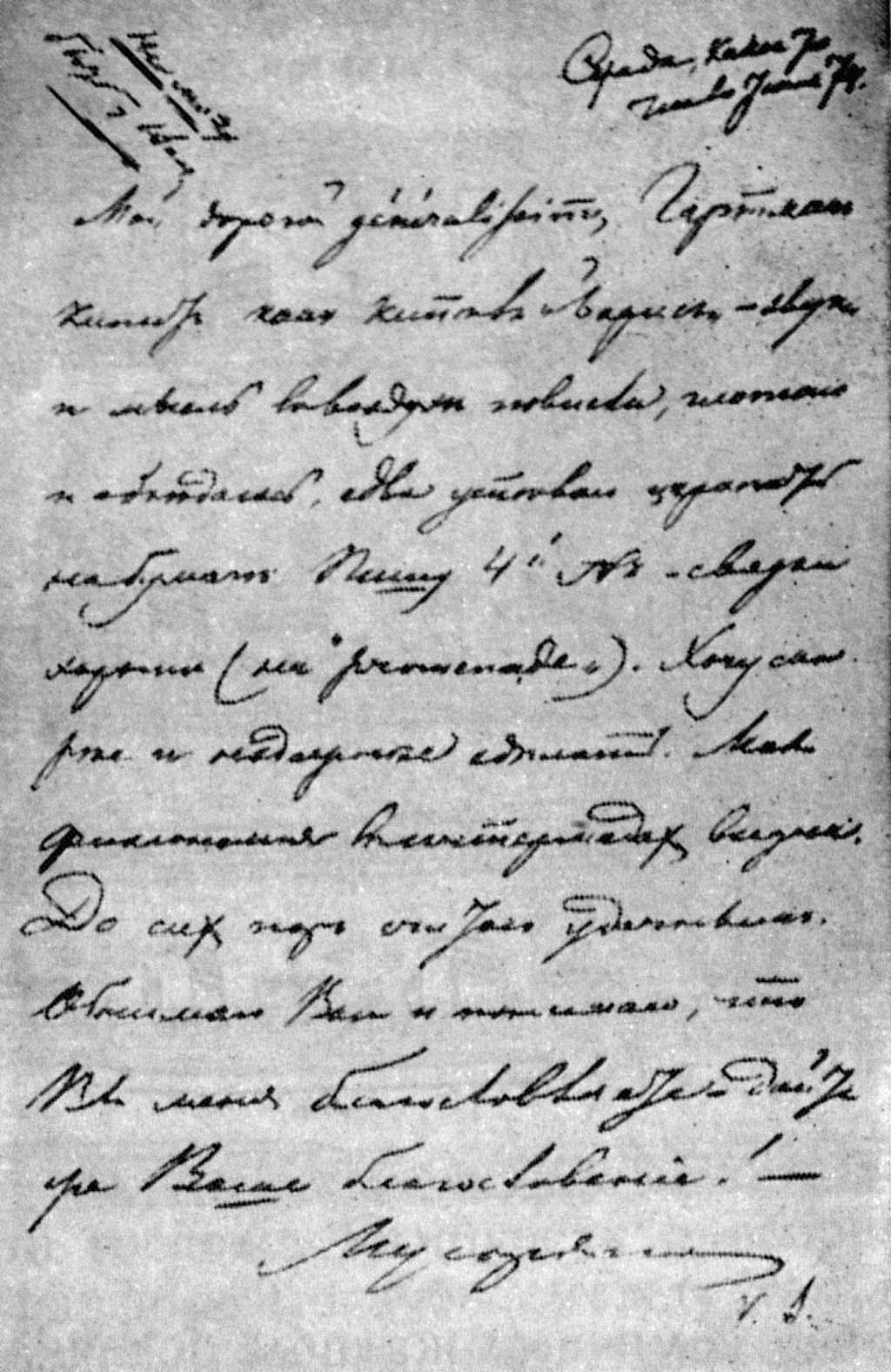
Mussorgsky's letter to Stasov, written while composing Pictures

My dear généralissime, Hartmann is boiling as Boris boiled—sounds and ideas hung in the air, I am gulping and overeating, and can barely manage to scribble them on paper. I am writing the 4th No.—the transitions are good (on the 'promenade'). I want to work more quickly and steadily. My physiognomy can be seen in the interludes. So far I think it's well turned ...

The music depicts his tour of the exhibition, with each of the ten numbers of the suite serving as a musical illustration of an individual work by Hartmann.

Five days after finishing the composition, he wrote on the title page of the manuscript a tribute to Vladimir Stasov, to whom the work is dedicated. One month later, he added an indication that he intended to have it published.

Golenishchev-Kutuzov gives the following (perhaps biased) account of the work's reception among Mussorgsky's friends and colleagues and an explanation for his failure to follow through on his plans to publish it:

Soon, with the composition of the musical illustrations for Pictures from an Exhibition by the architect Hartmann, he reached the acme of that musical radicalism, to whose 'new shores' and to whose 'unfathomed depths' the admirers of his 'Peepshows' and 'Savishnas' had pushed him so diligently. In music for these illustrations, as Mussorgsky called them, he represented [chicks], children, Baba Yaga in her wooden house on chicken legs, catacombs, gates, and even rattling carts. All this was not done jokingly, but 'seriously'.

There was no end to the enthusiasm shown by his devotees; but many of Mussorgsky's friends, on the other hand, and especially the comrade composers, were seriously puzzled and, listening to the 'novelty,' shook their heads in bewilderment. Naturally, Mussorgsky noticed their bewilderment and seemed to feel that he 'had gone too far.' He set the illustrations aside without even trying to publish them. Mussorgsky devoted himself exclusively to Khovanshchina.

== Publication history ==
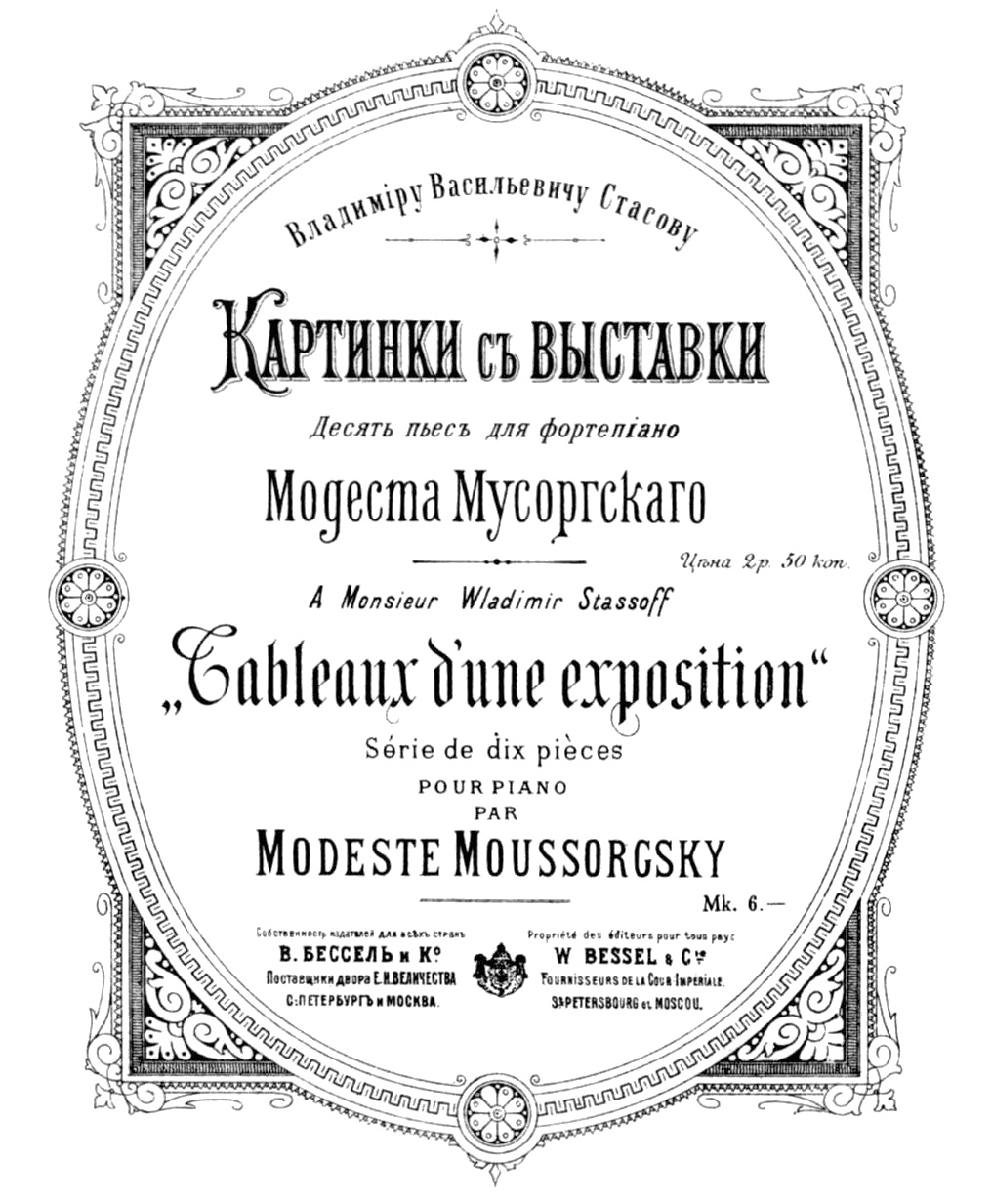
Cover of first edition

Pictures at an Exhibition was first published by Mussorgsky's friend and colleague Nikolai Rimsky-Korsakov in 1886, five years after Mussorgsky's death.

Published editions
Year	Editor	Publisher	Notes
1886	Nikolay Rimsky-Korsakov	V. Bessel and Co., Saint Petersburg	Revised edition
1931	Pavel Lamm	Muzgiz, Moscow	Restoration of the composer's score; included in Volume 8 of Lamm's M. P. Mussorgsky: Complete Collected Works (1939)
1940	Luigi Dallapiccola		
1975	—	Muzïka, Moscow	Mussorgsky's hand-written manuscript

== Hartmann's pictures ==
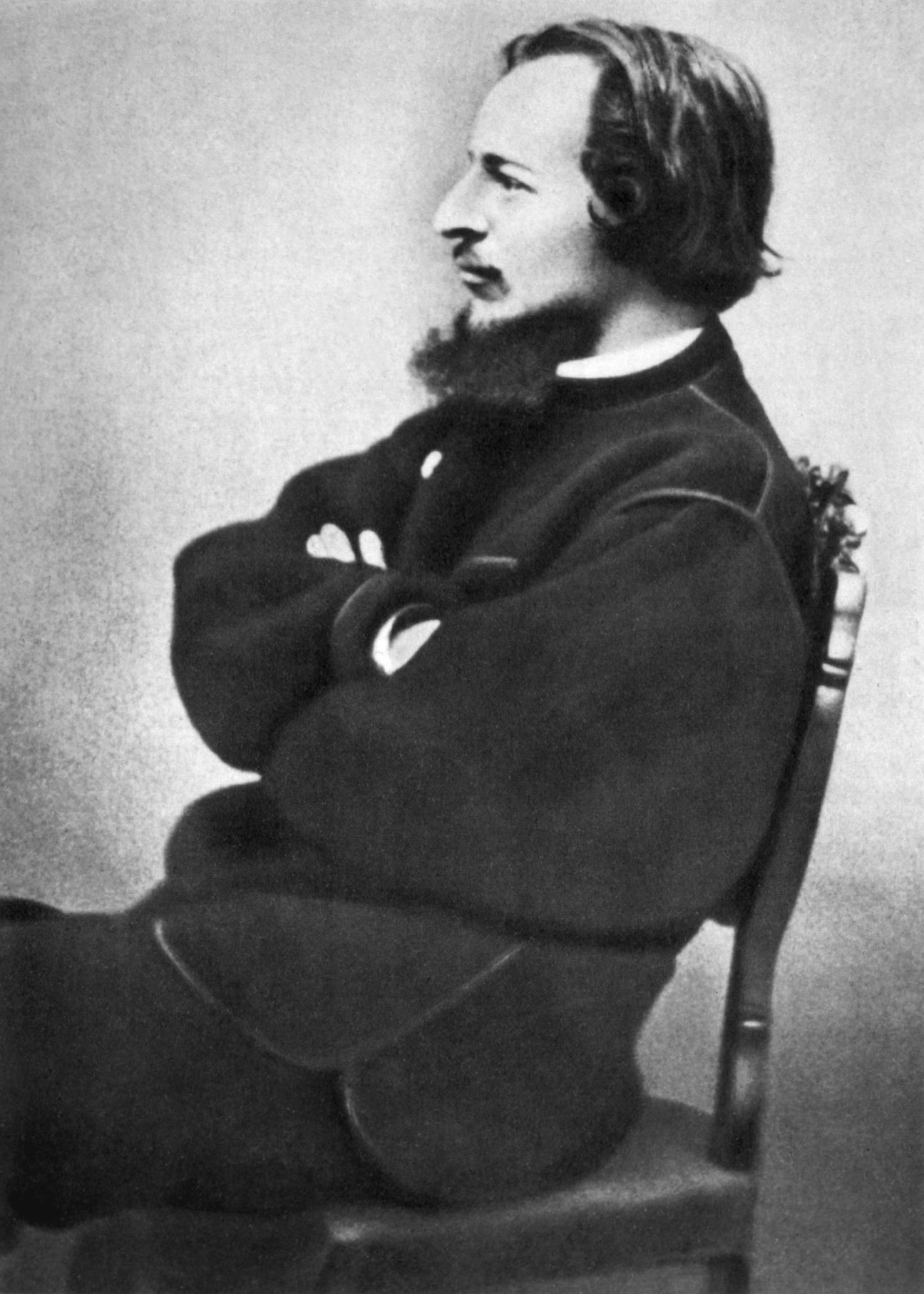
Viktor Hartmann

Mussorgsky based his musical material on drawings and watercolours by Hartmann produced mostly during the artist's travels abroad. Locales include Italy, France, Poland, Russia, and Ukraine. Today, most of the pictures from the Hartmann exhibition are lost, making it impossible to be sure in many cases which Hartmann works Mussorgsky had in mind.

Arts critic Alfred Frankenstein gave an account of Hartmann, with reproductions of his pictures, in the article "Victor Hartmann and Modeste Mussorgsky" in The Musical Quarterly (July 1939). Frankenstein wrote that he had identified seven pictures by catalogue number, corresponding to:

- "Tuileries" [Movement 3] (now lost)
- "Ballet of the Unhatched Chicks" [Movement 5]
- "Samuel Goldenberg and Schmuÿle" [Movement 6] (Frankenstein suggested two separate portraits, still extant, as the basis for "Two Jews: Rich and Poor")
- "Catacombs" [Movement 8]
- "The Hut on Hen's Legs" [Movement 9]
- "The Great Gate of Kiev" [Movement 10]

The surviving works that can be shown with certainty to have been used by Mussorgsky in assembling his suite, along with their titles, are as follows:

Movement	Title	Title (English)	Picture
2. The Old Castle	Замок в Чермоморе	The castle at Chermomor	Viktor Hartmann - The castle at Chermomor (Chermomor?)
5. Ballet of the Unhatched Chicks	Эскизы театральных костюмов к балету "Трильби"	Sketches of theatre costumes for the ballet Trilby	
6. "Samuel" Goldenberg and "Schmuÿle"	Еврей в меховой шапке. Сандомир	Jew in a fur cap. Sandomierz	
6. "Samuel" Goldenberg and "Schmuÿle"	Сандомирский [еврей]	Sandomierz [Jew]	
8. Catacombs (Roman Tomb)	Парижские катакомбы (с фигурами В. А. Гартмана, В. А. Кенеля и проводника, держащего фонарь)	Paris Catacombs (with the figures of V. A. Hartmann, V. A. Kenel, and a guide holding a lantern)	
9. The Hut on Hen's Legs ([The Hut] of Baba Yaga)	Избушка Бабы-Яги на курьих ножках. Часы в русском стиле	The hut of Baba-Yaga on hen's legs. Clock in the Russian style	
10. The Great Gate of Kiev	Проект городских ворот в Киеве. Главный фасад	Project for city gates in Kiev. Main façade	

Note: Mussorgsky owned the two pictures that together inspired No. 6, the so-called "Two Jews". The title of No. 6b, as provided by the Soviet editors of his letters, is Сандомирский [еврей] (Sandomirskiy [yevrey] or Sandomierz [Jew]). The bracketed word yevrey (lit. "Hebrew") is the sanitized form of the actual word in the title, very likely the derogatory epithet жид (zhid or yid).

== Movements ==
Vladimir Stasov's program, identified below, and the six known extant pictures suggest the ten pieces that make up the suite correspond to eleven pictures by Hartmann, with "Samuel Goldenberg und Schmuÿle" accounting for two. The five Promenades are not numbered with the ten pictures and consist in the composer's manuscript of two titled movements and three untitled interludes appended to the first, second, and fourth pictures.

Order of movements
No.	Title in score	English translation	Key	Meter	Tempo
	Promenade		B♭ major	5/4, 6/4	Allegro giusto, nel modo russico; senza allegrezza, ma poco sostenuto
1	Gnomus (Latin)	The Gnome	E♭ minor	3/4	Vivo and Meno mosso, pesante
	Promenade		A♭ major	5/4, 6/4	Moderato commodo assai e con delicatezza
2	Il vecchio castello (Italian)	The Old Castle	G♯ minor	6/8	Andante molto cantabile e con dolore
	Promenade		B major	5/4, 6/4	Moderato non tanto, pesamente
3	Tuileries (Dispute d'enfants après jeux) (French)	Tuileries (Children's Quarrel after Games)	B major	common time	Allegretto non troppo, capriccioso
4	Bydło (Polish)	Cattle	G♯ minor	2/4	Sempre moderato, pesante
	Promenade		D minor	5/4, 6/4, 7/4	Tranquillo
5	Балет невылупившихся птенцов (Russian); Balet nevylupivshikhsya ptentsov (trans.)	Ballet of Unhatched Chicks	F major	2/4	Scherzino
6	"Samuel" Goldenberg und "Schmuÿle" (Yiddish)	"Samuel" Goldenberg and "Schmuÿle"	B♭ minor	common time	Andante. Grave energico and Andantino
	Promenade (omitted in Ravel Orchestration)		B♭ major	5/4, 6/4, 7/4	Allegro giusto, nel modo russico, poco sostenuto
7	Limoges. Le marché (La grande nouvelle) (French)	Limoges. The Market (The Great News)	E♭ major	common time	Allegretto vivo, sempre scherzando
8	Catacombae (Sepulcrum romanum) (Latin)	Catacombs (Roman Tomb)	B minor	3/4	Largo
8	Cum mortuis in lingua mortua (Latin)	With the Dead in a Dead Language	B minor	6/4	Andante non troppo con lamento
9	Избушка на курьих ножках (Баба-Яга) (Russian); Izbushka na kuryikh nozhkakh (Baba-Yaga) (trans.)	The Hut on Hen's Legs (Baba Yaga)	C minor	2/4	Allegro con brio, feroce and Andante mosso
10	Богатырские ворота (В стольном городе во Киеве) (Russian); Bogatyrskiye vorota (V stolnom gorode vo Kiyeve) (trans.)	The Great Gate of Kiev (This is the common English title; a more literal translation is "The Bogatyr Gates (In the Capital in Kiev)")	E♭ major	cut time	Allegro alla breve. Maestoso, con grandezza

=== Promenade ===
Promenade – The Gnome (3:32)
MIDI realization

Vladimir Stasov's comment: In this piece Mussorgsky depicts himself "roving through the exhibition, now leisurely, now briskly in order to come close to a picture that had attracted his attention, and at times sadly, thinking of his departed friend."

The piece has simple, strong rhythms in asymmetrical meter. The promenade theme is shown below:

=== 1. The Gnome ===
Stasov's comment: "A sketch depicting a little gnome, clumsily running with crooked legs."

Hartmann's sketch, now lost, is thought to represent a design for a nutcracker displaying large teeth. The lurching music, in contrasting tempos with frequent stops and starts, suggests the movements of the gnome.

=== Promenade (2nd) ===
Promenade – The Old Castle (4:38)
MIDI realization

A placid statement of the promenade melody depicts the viewer walking from one display to the next.

=== 2. The Old Castle ===
Stasov's comment: "A medieval castle before which a troubadour sings a song."

This movement is thought to be based on a watercolor depiction of an Italian castle and is portrayed in Ravel's orchestration by a bassoon and alto saxophone duet. Hartmann often placed appropriate human figures in his architectural renderings to suggest scale.

=== Promenade (3rd) ===
Promenade – Tuileries (1:27)
MIDI realization

Another brief statement of the promenade melody (8 measures) gives it more extroversion and weight than before.

=== 3. Tuileries (Children's Quarrel after Games) ===
Stasov's comment: "An avenue in the garden of the Tuileries, with a swarm of children and nurses."

Hartmann's picture of the Jardin des Tuileries near the Louvre in Paris (France) is now lost. Figures of children quarrelling and playing in the garden were likely added by the artist for scale (see note on No. 2 above).

The movement is cast in through-composed ternary form (ABA).

=== 4. Cattle ===
Cattle (2:51)
MIDI realization

Stasov's comment: "A Polish cart on enormous wheels, drawn by oxen."

The movement is cast in through-composed ternary form (ABA) with coda. Mussorgsky's original piano version of this movement begins fortissimo (ff), suggesting that the lumbering oxcart's journey begins in the listener's foreground. After reaching a climax (con tutta forza), the dynamic marking is abruptly piano (bar 47), followed by a diminuendo to a final pianississimo (ppp), suggesting the oxcart receding into the distance. Rimsky-Korsakov's edition, and arrangements based on it such as Ravel's, begin quietly, build gradually (crescendo) to fortissimo and then undergo a diminuendo, suggesting the oxcart approaching, passing the listener, and then receding.

=== Promenade (4th) ===
Promenade – Ballet of Unhatched Chicks (1:40)
MIDI realization

A reflective 10-measure presentation of the promenade theme.

=== 5. Ballet of Unhatched Chicks ===
Stasov's comment: "Hartmann's design for the décor of a picturesque scene in the ballet Trilby."

Gerald Abraham provides the following details: "Trilby or The Demon of the Heath, a ballet with choreography by Petipa, music by Julius Gerber, and décor by Hartmann, based on Charles Nodier's Trilby, or The Elf of Argyle, was produced at the Bolshoi Theatre, Saint Petersburg, in 1871. The fledglings were canary chicks."

The movement is cast in ternary form (ABA) with a literal repeat and terse extension (coda).

=== 6. "Samuel Goldenberg and Schmuÿle" ===
"Samuel Goldenberg and Schmuÿle" (2:03)
MIDI realization

Stasov's comment: "Two Jews: rich and poor" (Russian: Два еврея: богатый и бедный)

Stasov's explanatory title elucidates the personal names used in Mussorgsky's original manuscript. Published versions display various combinations, such as "Two Polish Jews, Rich and Poor (Samuel Goldenberg and Schmuyle)". The movement is thought to be based on two separate extant portraits.

The use of augmented second intervals approximates Jewish modes such as the Phrygian dominant scale. The movement is in ternary form A – B – A+B:

- Andante, grave energico (Theme 1 "Samuel Goldenberg")
- Andantino (Theme 2 "Schmuÿle")
- Andante, grave energico (Themes 1 and 2 in counterpoint)
- Coda

=== Promenade (5th) ===
Promenade – Limoges – Catacombae – Con mortuis in lingua mortua (6:01)
MIDI realization

A nearly bar-for-bar restatement of the opening promenade. Differences are slight: condensed second half, block chords voiced more fully. Structurally, the movement acts as a reprise, giving listeners another hearing of the opening material before these are developed in the second half of the suite.

Many arrangements, including Ravel's orchestral version, omit this movement.

=== 7. Limoges. The Market (The Great News) ===
Stasov's comment: "French women quarrelling violently in the market."

Limoges is a city in central France. Mussorgsky originally provided two paragraphs in French that described a marketplace discussion (the 'great news'), but subsequently crossed them out in the manuscript.

The movement is a scherzo in through-composed ternary form (ABA). A scurrying coda leads without a break into the next movement.

=== 8. Catacombs (Roman Tomb) – With the Dead in a Dead Language ===
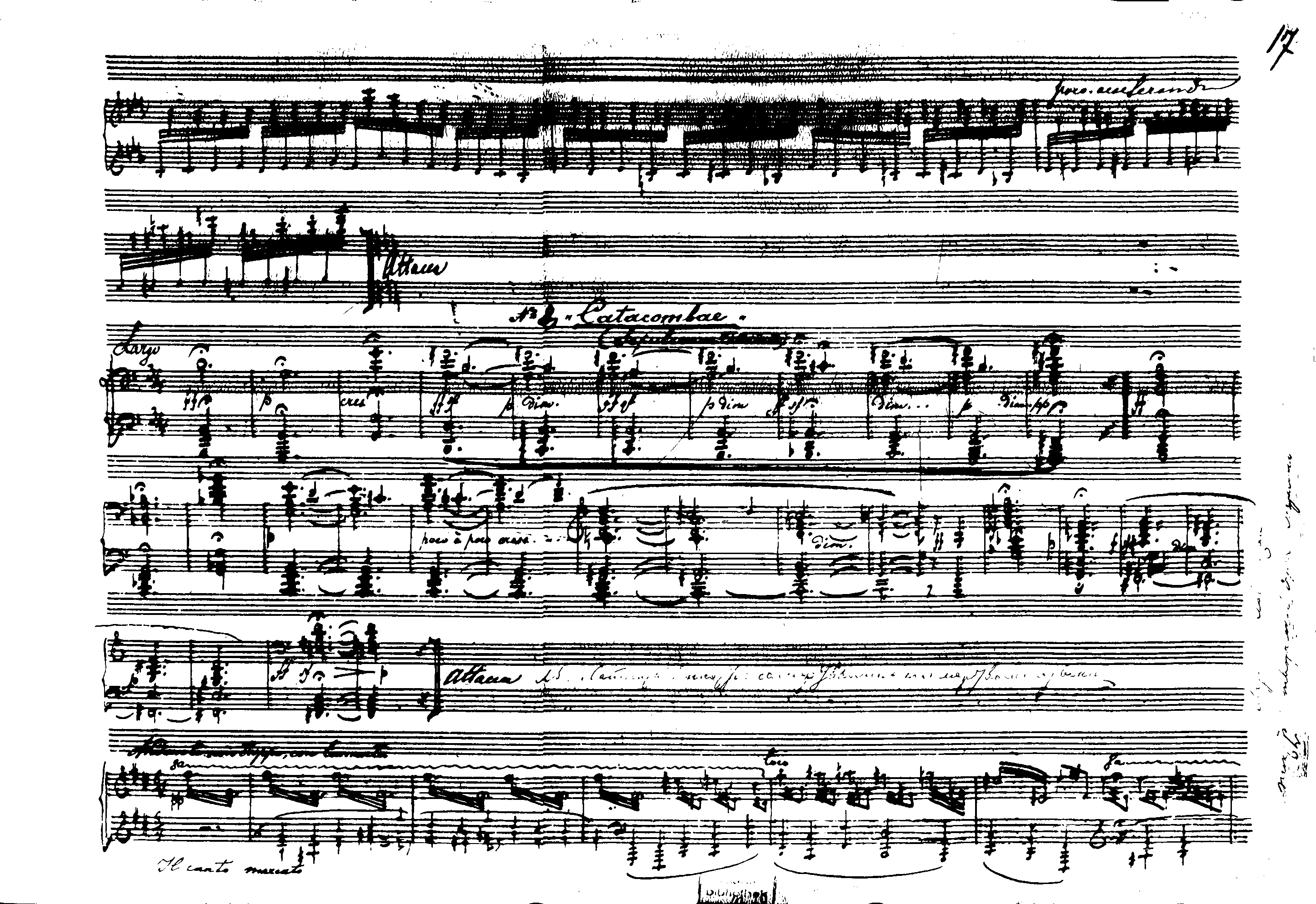
"Catacombae" and "Cum mortuis in lingua mortua" from Mussorgsky's manuscript

Stasov's comment: "Hartmann represented himself examining the Paris catacombs by the light of a lantern."

The movement is in two distinct parts. Its two sections consist of a nearly static Largo consisting of a sequence of block chords with elegiac lines adding a touch of melancholy and a more flowing, gloomy Andante that introduces the Promenade theme into the scene.

The first section's alternating loud and soft chords evoke the grandeur, stillness, and echo of the catacombs. The second section suggests a merging of observer and scene as the observer descends into the catacombs. Mussorgsky's manuscript of "Catacombs" (shown right) displays two pencilled notes, in Russian: "NB – Latin text: With the dead in a dead language" and, along the right margin, "Well may it be in Latin! The creative spirit of the dead Hartmann leads me towards the skulls, invokes them; the skulls begin to glow softly."

=== 9. The Hut on Hen's Legs (Baba Yaga) ===
The Hut on Hen's Legs – The Great Gate of Kiev (7:22)
MIDI realization

Stasov's comment: "Hartmann's drawing depicted a clock in the form of Baba Yaga's hut on hen's legs. Mussorgsky added the witch's flight in a mortar."

A scherzo marked Feroce with a slower middle section. Motives in this movement evoke the bells of a large clock and the whirlwind sounds of a chase. Structurally, the movement mirrors the grotesque qualities of "Gnomus" on a grand scale.

The movement is cast in ternary form (ABA):

- Allegro con brio, feroce
- Andante mosso
- Allegro molto (a nearly literal repeat)
- Coda

The coda leads without a break into the final movement of the suite.

=== 10. The Great Gate of Kiev ===
A more literal translation of the title is "The Bogatyr Gates (In the Capital in Kiev)"

Stasov's comment: "Hartmann's sketch was his design for city gates at Kiev in the ancient Russian massive style with a cupola shaped like a slavonic helmet."

Bogatyrs are heroes that appear in Russian epics called bylinas. Hartmann designed a monumental gate for Tsar Alexander II to commemorate the monarch's narrow escape from an assassination attempt on April 4, 1866. Hartmann regarded his design as the best work he had done. His design won the national competition but plans to build the structure were later cancelled.

The movement's grand main theme exalts the opening Promenade much as "Baba Yaga" amplified "Gnomus"; also like that movement, it evens out the meter of its earlier counterpart. The solemn secondary theme is based on a baptismal hymn from the repertory of Russian Orthodox chant.

The movement is cast as a broad rondo in two main sections: ABAB–CADA. The first half of the movement sets up the expectation of an ABABA pattern. The interruption of this pattern with new music just before its expected conclusion gives the rest of the movement the feeling of a vast extension. This extended leave-taking acts as a coda for the suite as a whole.

- A: Main Theme (forte, then fortissimo); maestoso
- B: Hymn Theme (piano) (A♭ minor); senza espressione (without expression)
- A: Main Theme (forte); descending and ascending scale figures suggest carillons.
- B: Hymn Theme (piano) (E♭ minor); senza espressione
- C: Interlude/Transition (mezzo forte with crescendo to forte); promenade theme recalled. Suggestions of clockwork, bells, ascent.
- A: Main Theme (fortissimo); Meno mosso, sempre maestoso. Triplet figuration.
- D: Interlude/Transition (mezzo forte with crescendo). Triplets.
- A: Main Theme (fortissimo); Grave, sempre allargando. The tempo slows to a standstill by the final cadence.

== Recording of the original manuscript ==
In 2009, the German pianist Lars David Kellner published the original version of Gnomus on his Mussorgsky album (Enharmonic) as a premiere. In 2014, the Russian pianist Andrej Hoteev presented (in a CD recording) a performance of "Pictures at an Exhibition" based on original manuscripts he consulted in the Russian National Library at Saint Petersburg. Hoteev found numerous discrepancies with conventional sheet music editions. He believes his recorded version expresses the composer's original intent. The most important deviations are documented with illustrations from the manuscripts in the accompanying CD booklet.

Further notable recordings exist from Theodore Kuchar, Valery Gergiev, Rafael Kubelík, Fritz Reiner and Riccardo Muti.

== Arrangements and interpretations ==
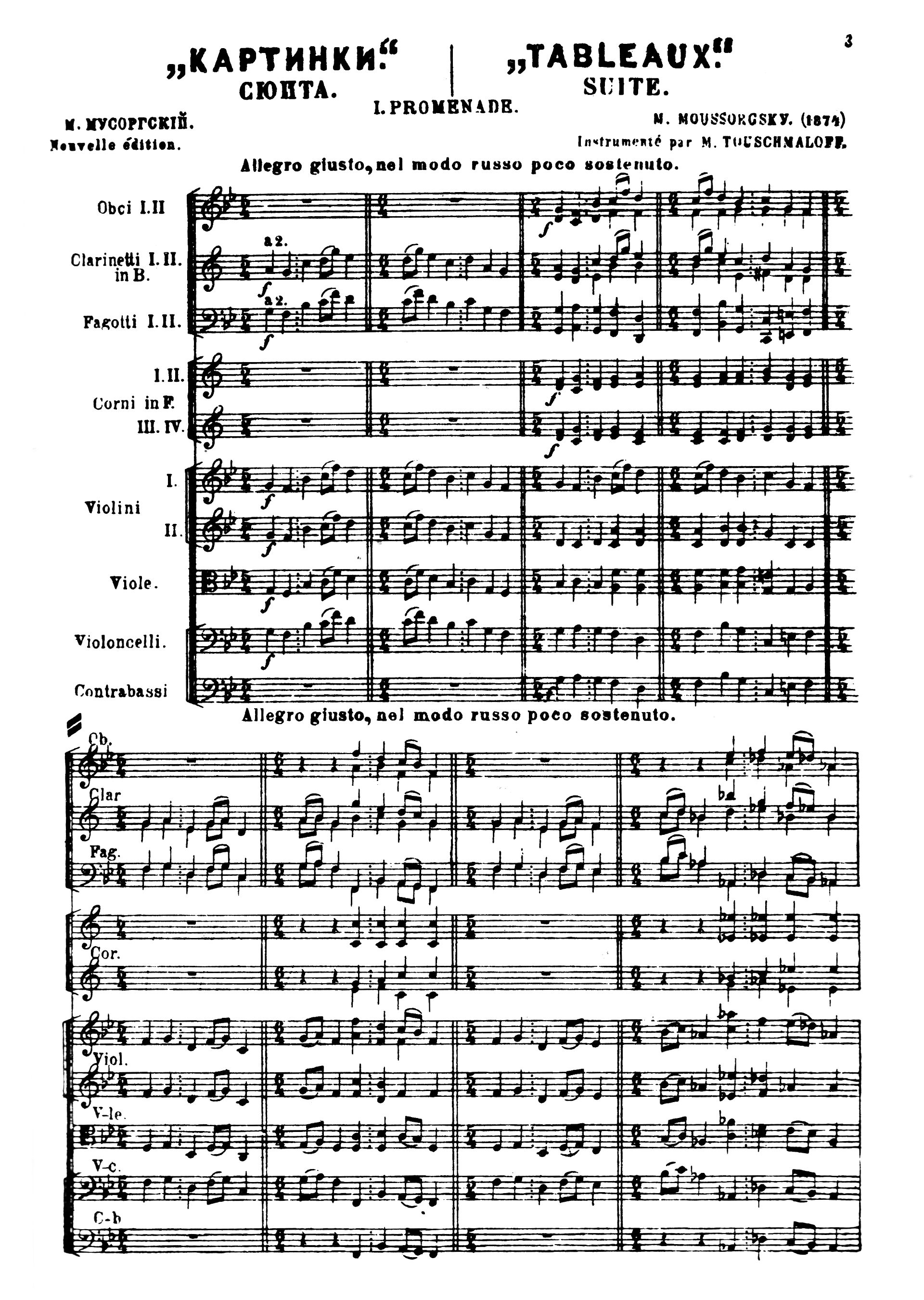
The opening bars of Tushmalov's orchestration of Pictures at an Exhibition

The first musician to arrange Mussorgsky's Pictures at an Exhibition for orchestra was the Russian composer and conductor Mikhail Tushmalov. However, his version (first performed in 1891 and possibly produced as early as 1886 when he was a student of Rimsky-Korsakov) does not include the entire suite: Only seven of the ten "pictures" are present, leaving out "Gnomus", "Tuileries", and "Cattle", and all the Promenades are omitted except for the last one, which is used in place of the first.

The next orchestration was undertaken by the British conductor Henry Wood in 1915. He recorded a few sections of his arrangement on a pair of acoustic Columbia 78 rpm discs in 1920. However, he withdrew his version when Maurice Ravel's orchestration was published, and banned every public performance in the 1930s in deference to Ravel's work. Wood's arrangement has also been recorded by the London Philharmonic Orchestra under Nicholas Braithwaite and issued on the Lyrita label. All but the first of the Promenade movements were omitted and other passages extensively re-composed. Wood's orchestration was once described by Gordon Jacob as "superior to Ravel's in picturesqueness and vividness", with its off-stage camel-bells in "Cattle" and grand organ in "The Great Gate of Kiev".

The first person to orchestrate the piece in its entirety was the Slovenian-born conductor and violinist Leo Funtek, who finished his version in 1922 while living and working in Finland.

Ravel's orchestration of Pictures at an Exhibition
Promenade (1:41)

1. Gnomus (2:42)

Promenade (0:57)

2. Il vecchio castello (4:45)

Promenade (0:30)

3. Tuileries (1:02)

4. Bydło (2:19)

Promenade (0:41)

5. Ballet des poussins dans leurs coques (1:18)

6. Samuel Goldenberg and Schmuyle (2:08)

7. Limoges. Le marche (1:40)

8a. Catacombae. Sepulcrum romanum (1:53)

8b. Cum mortuis in lingua mortua (1:51)

9. La cabane sur des pattes de poule (3:32)

10. La grande porte de Kiev (5:28)
Performed by the Skidmore College Orchestra

The version by Maurice Ravel, produced in 1922 on a commission by Serge Koussevitzky, is the most widely-performed version. Ravel omitted the fifth Promenade, among other alterations. Koussevitzky's commission, worked out with the publishers of the piano suite, gave him sole conducting rights for several years; he conducted the first performance in Paris on 19 October 1922. He published Ravel's score himself and in 1930 made the first recording of it with the Boston Symphony Orchestra. The exclusive nature of his commission prompted the release of a number of contemporary versions by other arrangers, including one by Ravel's student Leonidas Leonardi commissioned by W. Bessel & Co., the original publisher of Mussorgsky's piano suite. Leonardi dedicated his setting of the suite to Igor Stravinsky and conducted the premiere in Paris with the Lamoureux Orchestra on 15 June 1924. Leonardi's version premiered in the United States on 4 December 1924, when the New York Symphony Orchestra performed it with Walter Damrosch conducting.

Although Ravel's version is most often performed and recorded, a number of conductors have made their own changes to the scoring. The conductor Leopold Stokowski produced his own orchestration (incorporating much re-composition) in 1939, aiming for what he called a more Slavic orchestral sound instead of Ravel's more Gallic approach. Conductor and pianist Vladimir Ashkenazy produced his own orchestral arrangement, expressing dissatisfaction with Ravel's interpretive liberties and perpetuation of early printing errors. The conductor Leonard Slatkin has performed compendium versions, in which each Promenade and picture is interpreted by a different orchestral arranger.

=== Orchestrations ===
A partial listing of orchestral arrangements of Pictures at an Exhibition:

- Mikhail Tushmalov (ca. 1886; three pictures and four Promenades omitted: recorded by Marc Andreae and the Munich Philharmonic for BASF.)
- Henry Wood (1915; four Promenades omitted: recorded by Nicholas Braithwaite and the London Philharmonic for Lyrita.)
- Leo Funtek (1922; all Promenades included: recorded by Leif Segerstam and the Finnish Radio Symphony for BIS; Also on Teldec Laser-disc with Vladimir Ashkenazy conducting the Swedish Radio Symphony Orchestra.)
- Maurice Ravel (1922; the fifth Promenade omitted.)
- Leonidas Leonardi (1924); for large symphony orchestra, arranged by a pupil of Ravel's.
- Lucien Cailliet (1937: recorded by Eugene Ormandy and the Philadelphia Orchestra for RCA and reissued on Biddulph.)
- Leopold Stokowski (1939; third Promenade, "Tuileries", fifth Promenade and "Limoges" omitted. Three recordings conducted by Stokowski himself: with the Philadelphia Orchestra, All-American Youth Orchestra, and New Philharmonia.)
- Walter Goehr (1942; "Gnomus" omitted; includes a subsidiary part for piano.)
- Sergei Gorchakov (1954: recorded by Kurt Masur and the London Philharmonic for Teldec; Also recorded with Karl Anton Rickenbacher, conducting the Krakow Radio Symphony, for the RCA Records. A live 1980 performance by the Leningrad Academic Symphony Orchestra under Konstantin Simeonov was recorded by Melodiya.)
- Nikolai Golovanov (A heavily edited version of Ravel's orchestration in which Golovanov omits all but the first of the Promenades was recorded for Melodiya.)
- Lawrence Leonard (1977; for piano and orchestra; recorded by Tamas Ungar, piano, with Geoffrey Simon and the Philharmonia Orchestra for Cala.)
- Vladimir Ashkenazy (1982: recorded by Ashkenazy and the Philharmonia Orchestra for Decca/London.)
- Francisco Mignone (date unknown; discovered after the composer's death in 1986.)
- Thomas Wilbrandt (1992)
- Émile Naoumoff (ca. 1994, in concerto style with some added music, for piano and orchestra; recorded with Igor Blaschkow conducting the Deutsches Symphony Orchestra Berlin, for Wergo.)
- Mekong Delta (1997; for group and orchestra.)
- Julian Yu (2001), for sixteen players or chamber orchestra
- Jason Wright Wingate (2003; orchestra, organ and chorus.)
- Hidemaro Konoye (date unknown.)
- Leonard Slatkin – Two compendium versions, the second of which he recorded with the BBC Symphony Orchestra for Warner Classics live at the BBC Proms on 1 September 2004; the other recording was with the Nashville Symphony for Naxos Records.
- Václav Smetáček (a performance with Gennady Rozhdestvensky conducting the Prague Symphony Orchestra on 28 October 2004 has been issued on the Don Industriale label.)
- Jukka-Pekka Saraste created a performing edition of his own, combining the orchestrations of Leo Funtek and Sergei Gorchakov, recorded with the Toronto Symphony Orchestra for Finlandia Records, a division of Warner Music Group.
- Amadeus Orchestra version, with one picture each provided by Alastair King, Roger May, Tolib Shakhidi, David Butterworth, Philip Mackenzie, Simon Whiteside, Daryl Griffiths, Natalia Villanueva, James McWilliam and Julian Kershaw. (2012, for large orchestra.)
- Peter Breiner (2012, for large orchestra.), recorded by Breiner and the New Zealand Symphony Orchestra for Naxos Records.
- Tomasz Golka (2019, for full orchestra, based on Mussorgsky's original manuscript)
- Jason Nett (2022, for Vancouver Island Symphony Orchestra "The Pictures Project", based on Mussorgsky's original manuscript.)
- David DeBoor Canfield (2023, for full orchestra, based on Mussorgsky's original manuscript; with reference to his orchestration in other works plus utilizing instruments not in existence in Mussorgsky's time.)
- Wong Kah Chun (2023)

=== Arrangements for concert band ===
- Erik W. G. Leidzén for the Edwin Franko Goldman band (1941; in three parts. Part 1 includes Promenade, The Old Castle, Tuileries, Bydło, and Ballet of the Unhatched Chickens, part 2 includes The Market Place at Limoges and Catacombs, and part 3 includes The Hut Of Baba-Yaga and The Great Gate of Kiev.); published by Carl Fischer, Inc.
- James Curnow (1985; for large wind ensemble; abridged version.)
- Paul Lavender for the United States Marine Band (2012; transcription of Ravel's original orchestration.)

=== Arrangements for other ensembles ===
Arrangements of Pictures at an Exhibition for performing ensembles other than orchestra:

- Giuseppe Becce (1930; for piano trio.)
- Vladimir Horowitz (1946; revised version for solo piano.)
- Ralph Burns (1957; for jazz orchestra.)
- Andrés Segovia (1958; for guitar; "The Old Castle" only.)
- Allyn Ferguson (ca. 1963; for jazz orchestra.)
- Calvin Hampton (1967; for organ.)
- Emerson, Lake & Palmer (1971; rock group, lyrics written by Greg Lake.); see Pictures at an Exhibition (Emerson, Lake & Palmer album).
- Keith Chapman (1972; for the Wanamaker Organ.)
- Isao Tomita (1966; various instruments for the Osamu Tezuka animated film.)
- Isao Tomita (1975; for synthesizer.)
- Elgar Howarth (ca. 1977; for brass ensemble. Recorded in 1977 by the Philip Jones Brass Ensemble for Argo.)
- Arthur Wills (1970s; for organ. Recorded in 1980 by Wills on the Organ of Ely Cathedral for Hyperion.)
- Jon Faddis (1978; for trumpet, in his solo album Good and Plenty with the track name "Promenade".)
- Kazuhito Yamashita (1980; for classical guitar.)
- Henk de Vlieger (1981; for percussion ensemble.)
- Hugh Lawson (1983; for jazz trio; from the album Colour.)
- William Schmidt (1986; for saxophone choir.)
- Jean Guillou (ca. 1988; for organ.)
- Peng Xiuwen (1989; for modern Chinese orchestra; Recorded in 1990 by China Broadcasting Chinese Orchestra, China Record Co. CCD90-085.)
- Jevgenija Lisicina (ca. 1991; for three pipe organs; ca. 1997 for organ and 14 percussion instruments.)
- Tangerine Dream (1994; Promenade for trumpet, saxophone, horns and synthesizer; on their Turn of the Tides album.)
- Mekong Delta (1997; for metal band.)
- Christian Lindberg (ca. 2000; for trombone and piano.)
- Wayne Lytle, for the DVD Animusic 2 under the title Cathedral Pictures (2005; for synthesizer; Promenade, "Baba Yaga" and "The Great Gate of Kiev".)
- Clarice Assad (2006; for string orchestra, piano and percussion.)
- Cameron Carpenter (2006, for organ.)
- Walter Hilgers (2006; for large brass ensemble, percussion, and two harps.)
- Glass Duo (2007; for glass harp.)
- Slav de Hren (2008; for a punk-jazz band and vocal ensemble. Some of the pieces are complete transcriptions, others are improvisations on the original theme.)
- Friendly Rich (2009; for avant-garde cabaret jazz ensemble.)
- Yaron Gottfried (2011; for jazz trio and orchestra.)
- Robert W. Smith (2012; Madison Scouts Drum And Bugle Corps.)
- Neil Cicierega (2014; for Smash Mouth–based mashup album "Mouth Sounds"; Promenade, made up of samples taken from "All Star" by Smash Mouth.)
- Ward Swingle (date unknown; for vocal ensemble, double bass and percussion; Limoges only.)

== Stage adaptations ==
=== Staging by Kandinsky ===
In 1928, the Russian artist Wassily Kandinsky created a stage show by combining his own designs for the pictures with a performance of the piano score. Since it was put on at Dessau, elements of the staging have been lost. However, it has proved possible to animate the surviving art work using video technology.

=== Staging by Gen Atem and S213 ===
In a hall on Attisholz-Areal, Switzerland, Gen Atem and S213 had a premiere performance on the basis of Ravel's orchestration of Mussorgsky's piano cycle in August 2021. Kaspar Zehnder and the Theatre Orchester Biel Solothurn provided the acoustical background in its entirety.

=== Ballet by Alexei Ratmansky ===
In 2014, choreographer Alexei Ratmansky created the ballet Pictures at an Exhibition, based on the orchestral score, for the New York City Ballet. The set featured a 1913 painting by Wassily Kandinsky, unrelated to Kandinsky’s 1928 staging.

== Sources ==
- Calvocoressi, Michel D.; Abraham, Gerald (1974) [1946]. Mussorgsky. Master Musicians, New Series (revised ed.). London: J. M. Dent & Sons. ISBN 0-460-03152-X. (originally published: Dutton, New York)
- Cristea, Ana (22 April 2016). Pianistic Mastery of Modest Mussorgsky's Pictures at an Exhibition: Developing Associative Thinking through Analysis of Musical Texture (Doctor of Musical Arts thesis). University of Miami.
- Frankenstein, Alfred (July 1939). "Victor Hartmann and Modeste Musorgsky". The Musical Quarterly. 25 (3): 268–291. doi:10.1093/mq/XXV.3.268.
- Mussorgsky, M., M. P. Musorgskiy: Letters, Gordeyeva, Ye. (editor), 2nd edition. Moscow: Music (publisher), 1984 [Мусоргский, М., М. П. Мусоргский: Письма, Гордеева, Е. (редактор), издание второе, Москва: Музыка, 1984].
- Mussorgsky, M., Pictures from an Exhibition (score), edited by P. Lamm. Moscow: Muzgiz, 1931
- Mussorgsky, M., Pictures from an Exhibition (manuscript facsimile). Moscow: Muzïka, 1975
- Orlova, Aleksandra Anatol'evna (1991). Musorgsky Remembered. Translated by Zaytzeff, Véronique; Morrison, Frederick. Bloomington and Indianapolis: Indiana University Press. ISBN 0-253-34264-3.
- Parrott, Jasper, and Vladimir Ashkenazy. Beyond Frontiers. London: Collins; London: Hamilton; New York: Atheneum, 1984. ISBN 0-00-216373-X (Collins); ISBN 0-241-11575-2 (Hamilton); ISBN 0-689-11505-9 (Atheneum)
- Russ, Michael (1992). Musorgsky: Pictures at an Exhibition. Cambridge Music Handbooks. Cambridge and New York: Cambridge University Press. ISBN 978-0-521-38607-4.
- Taruskin, Richard (1993). Musorgsky: Eight Essays and an Epilogue. Princeton: Princeton University Press. ISBN 0-691-09147-1.
