= Slav de Hren =

Bulgarian musical duo

Slav de Hren is a Bulgarian musical duo, formed in 2005, whose work combines jazz, rock and classical music. The members are George Marinov, an underground avant-garde guitar player, and Svetoslav Bitrakov, an experienced soft jazz and rock drummer. They have released two albums.

== Band members ==
Svetoslav Bitrakov played the drums for five bands in the period between 1981 and 1991: Canon, Dilemma, New Generation, Slaviani and Accent. Lubomir Velev joined Svetoslav Bitrakov in 1991 to form the group “Slav”, which released six albums. During the same period he produced two more solo albums named Slavi Bitrakov in 1993 and Seconds in 1996. From 2003 to 2006 he wrote a book of short stories named Magician's Top Hat, Unusual Small Stories.

George Marinov, with Dimitar Voev and Pencho Popov, formed the band Wozzeck and Chugra in 1985. The band released seven albums. The last one was in 1992: Bergologia.

== The band ==
The two musicians combined in 2005 to "explore a more experimental, more moody, more various type of music."

The band's first electronic, trash jazz album, Tavata, was recorded in 2006.

In 2007 Svilen Ivanov (bass) and Petya Dankova (vocal) joined the group to record their second album Pictures at an Exhibition, a punk jazz version of Mussorgsky’s piano suite.

They have been described on Soundclick as "An aggressively-elegant playing of the classics, with an amazing vocal, virtuoso guitars and rockin' drum'n'base."

== Discography ==
- Tavata 2006 (released by EPAY LTD, Sofia)
- Pictures at an Exhibition 2008 (released by ePay Rocks)
