= Pictures at an Exhibition (Stokowski orchestration) =

1939 orchestration by Leopold Stokowski

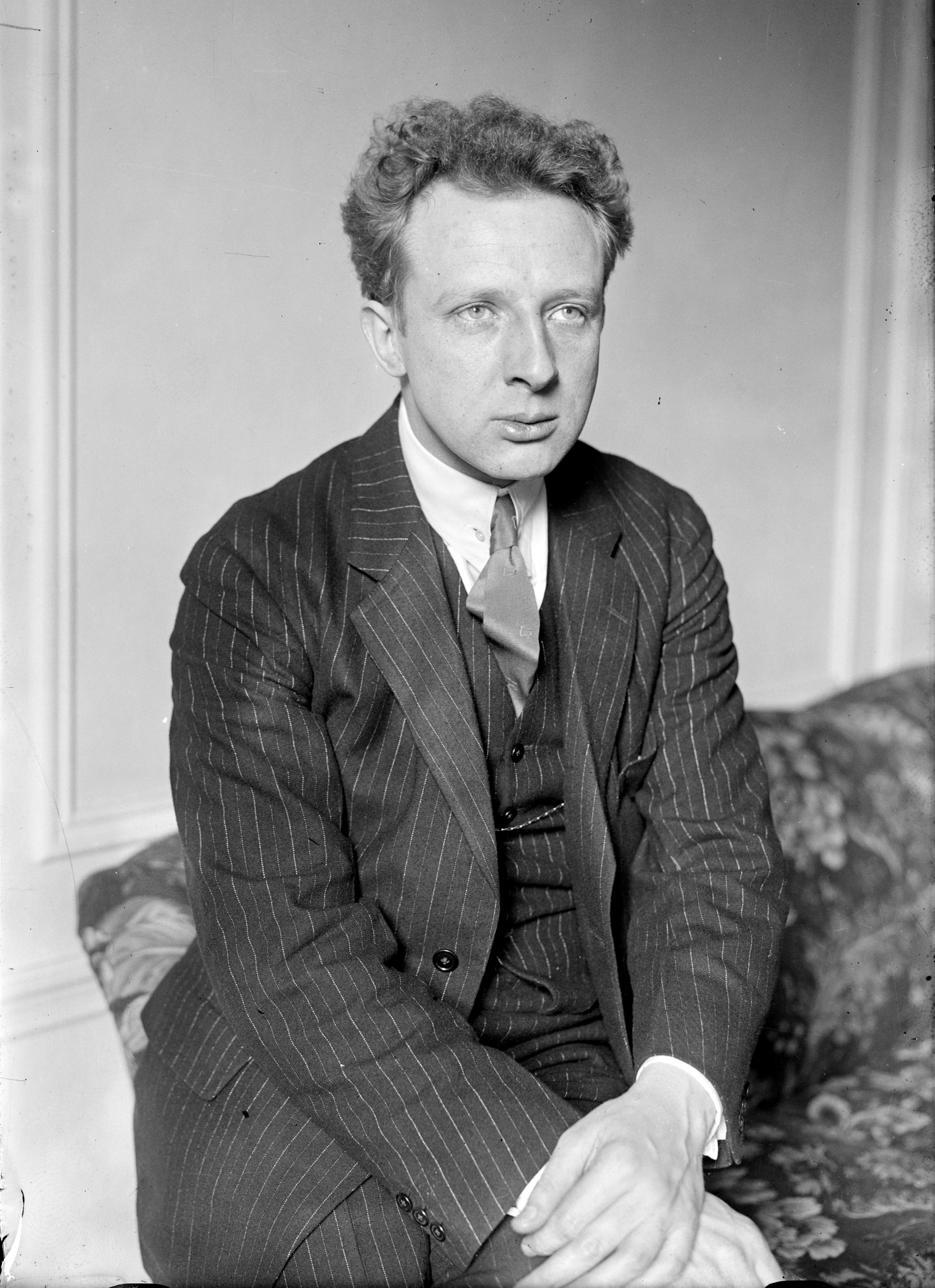
Leopold Stokowski, photographed by George Grantham Bain

Leopold Stokowski's orchestration of Pictures at an Exhibition by Modest Mussorgsky was completed in 1939 and premiered later that year, on 17 November, by the Philadelphia Orchestra.

Mussorgsky's original 1874 composition was a suite for piano, however, the piece has gained most of its fame through the many orchestrations of it that have been produced. The most popular of these arrangements was completed in 1922 by French composer Maurice Ravel. Stokowski introduced the Ravel orchestration of Pictures to Philadelphia audiences in 1929, but was not fully satisfied with the arrangement, feeling it needed a more Slavic sound. His version was finished 10 years later, without much of the French influence he saw in Ravel's.

Stokowski omits two movements, "Tuileries" and "Limoges", because he felt they showed too much French influence and had a suspicion they might have been composed by Nikolai Rimsky-Korsakov, whose 1886 edition was the first published version of Mussorgsky's work.

== Instrumentation ==
Stokowski transcribed Pictures at an Exhibition for a large orchestra consisting of the following instruments.

Woodwinds

4 flutes (the second doubling alto flute; the third and fourth doubling piccolos)
3 oboes
1 English horn
3 clarinets in B♭ and A (the third doubling clarinet in E♭)
1 bass clarinet in B♭
3 bassoons
1 contrabassoon

Brass

8 horns in F
4 trumpets in C
3 trombones
1 bass trombone
1 tuba (or euphonium)

Percussion

6 timpani

snare drum
tambourine
triangle
cymbals
bass drum
tam-tam

marimbaphone (or xylophone)
vibraphone (or glockenspiel)
tubular bells

Keyboard

1 pipe organ
1 celesta (or piano)

Strings

2 harps

violin I
violin II
viola
cello
double bass

== Movements ==
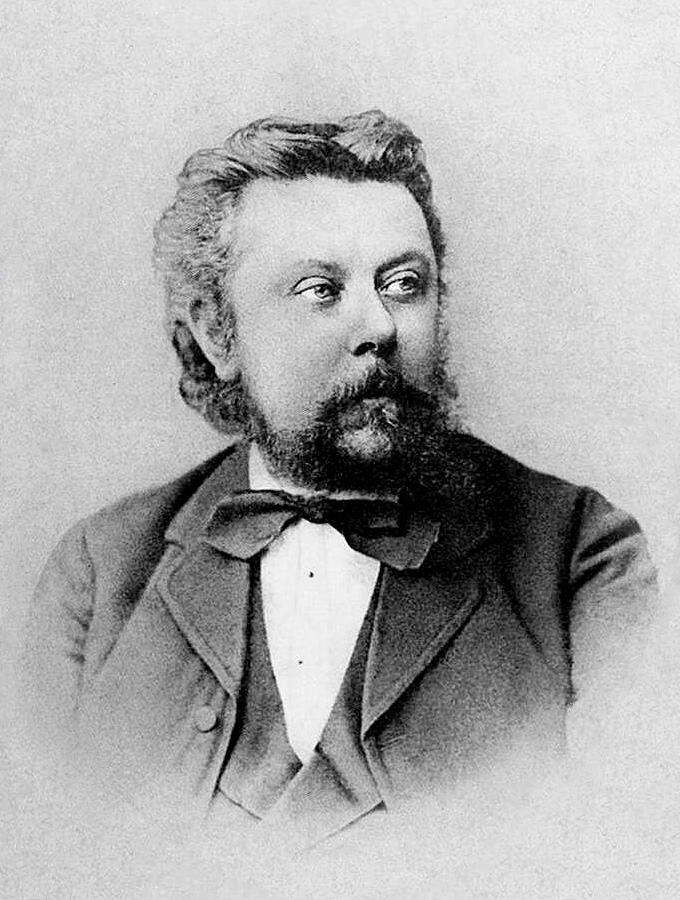
Modest Mussorgsky in 1874

=== I. Promenade ===
Stokowski's opening "Promenade" is less showy than Ravel's brass fanfare; it is instead mainly given to low strings and woodwinds, creating deep, chorale-like textures. The brass do not enter until near the end.

=== II. Gnomus ===
The kaleidoscopic orchestration of this grotesque movement recalls Stokowski's version of Night on Bald Mountain. Muted brasses are featured quite prominently, as is the xylophone. Stokowski's canvas depends more on strange woodwind and brass sounds than Ravel's percussion (including whip).

=== III. Promenade ===
A bassoon replaces Ravel's horn in this movement, and alternates with mysterious string tremolos. The end fades into the next section.

=== IV. The Old Castle ===
After a desolate opening of bassoon and low strings, the English horn enters with the troubador's song. Muted strings contribute to the dreamy texture, as does the relentless pulse of the timpani.

=== V. Bydło ===
The low strings bear the heavy burden of the ox-cart, with the melody carried by horns and tuba. The climax is ushered in by an overwhelming percussion crescendo, the melody in the violins, trumpets, horns and the ox-cart in the timpani. Stokowski follows Mussorgsky's original score here by having the movement start fortissimo, instead of Ravel's pianissimo.

=== VI. Promenade ===
The mysterious string tremolos reappear in this section, having the bulk of the melody. Flutes enter at the end, anticipating the next movement.

=== VII. Ballet of the Unhatched Chicks ===
Stokowski, like Ravel, uses mainly woodwind textures here; however, the two orchestrations manage to sound completely different. Stokowski's arrangement does not smooth over the dissonances as Ravel's does: it accentuates them. The string tremolos reappear in the middle section, alternating with a squeaking oboe.

=== VIII. Samuel Goldenberg and Schmuÿle ===
This is the only of Stokowski's movements that owes much to Ravel. However, it does have some colors of its own: A flute alternates with the muted trumpet in the poor man's plea, and the return of the pompous "rich man" theme uses ominous trombone glissandos to great effect.

=== IX. Catacombs ===
Stokowski's heritage as an organist is very apparent in this section, with brass choirs piled on top of one another in gigantic chords. The section contains a number of spooky effects, such as the violins' glissandos and the presence of bass drum and gong.

=== X. Cum mortis in lingua mortua ===
The string tremolos return more ominously than ever in this movement, although the orchestration is not as dark as Ravel's. The sentimental second section features a solo violin, with frequent use of portamento.

=== XI. The Hut on Fowl's Legs (Baba-Yaga) ===
This movement again shows a conscious difference from Ravel's: The Frenchman's is a pounding, brutal, percussionistic piece, while Stokowski's is more a grotesque scherzo—a danse macabre. The piece opens with the major sevenths being given out in snarls of muted brass. As in "Gnomus", phantasmagoric effects of orchestration flit briefly by in a nightmarish kaleidoscope—grunting strings, snarling brass, shrieking woodwinds. The middle section features Stokowski's most brilliant orchestral touch in the piece—fluttertongued trills and tremolos on the horns and muted trumpets; later the downward chromatic scale is fluttertongued on the muted trombones. Afterward the danse macabre returns, only to blow away into the distance as the next movement enters.

=== XII. The Great Gate of Kiev ===
This movement sums up two important characteristics of Stokowki's orchestration: His giant, organlike chords (it actually uses an organ) and his penchant for gong and bell sounds. The organ influence is obvious from the opening brass chorale. In the chorale sections, Stokowski ignores Mussorgsky's marking senza espressivo (without expression) and gives them to a luscious string choir. Bell sounds enter with the scales that accompany the second occurrence of the "Gate" theme, and gong sounds with the dissonant chiming of the middle section. Unlike Ravel's, Stokowski's quarter note triplets in the penultimate "Gate" statement are audible, played fanfare-like in the brass and timpani. The piece ends with giant chords for organ and orchestra and a huge smash on the gong.

== Recordings ==
Leopold Stokowski made three commercial recordings of his arrangement: (1) with the Philadelphia Orchestra for RCA Victor (1939); (2) with the All-American Youth Orchestra for US Columbia (1941); and (3) with the New Philharmonia for Decca (1965). Two 'live' Stokowski performances have also been released on CD: (a) with the Philadelphia Orchestra in 1962 on Pristine Audio; and (b) with the BBC Symphony from 1963 (its UK Premiere) on Music & Arts.

Other recordings have been made by Matthias Bamert and the BBC Philharmonic (Chandos); José Serebrier and the Bournemouth Symphony (Naxos); Oliver Knussen and the Cleveland Orchestra (DG); Gennady Rozhdestvensky and the USSR State Symphony Orchestra (Revelation); James Sedares and the New Zealand Symphony (Koch International); Kazuki Yamada and the Japan Philharmonic (Exton). Erich Kunzel and the Cincinnati Pops recorded just 'The Great Gate' on its own, complete with the 'optional' organ part at the end, for Telarc.
