= Symphony Ihatov =

Symphony composed by Isao Tomita

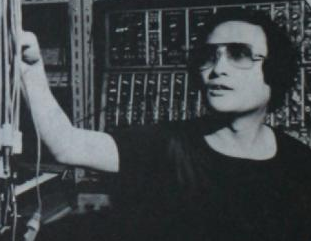
Isao Tomita in 1977

Symphony Ihatov is a symphony composed by Japanese composer Isao Tomita, inspired by the world of works by Kenji Miyazawa and the singing voice of a vocaloid, Hatsune Miku. It consists of seven movements, being scored for large orchestra, solo virtual singer, mixed choir, children's choir. Tomita extensively used musical quotation from past classical pieces. Symphony Ihatov was so well-received that, unusually as a contemporary music, it has been reperformed many times.

== History of composition ==
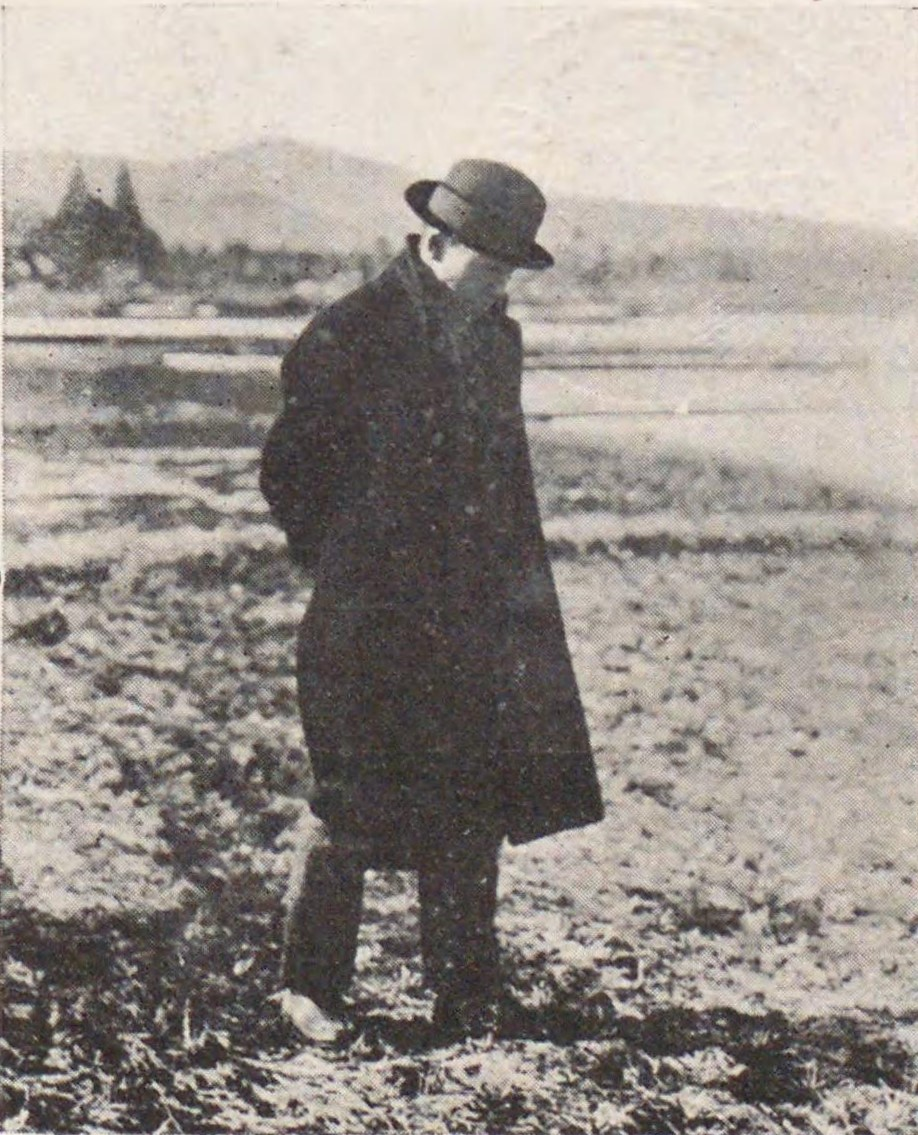
Kenji Miyazawa around 1924

Isao Tomita, known as one of the pioneers of electronic music, was born in 1932, the year before Kenji Miyazawa died in 1933. Tomita is said to have first read Kenji's works during World War II. Kenji was unknown during his lifetime, but his works got started to become famous when one of his children's story collections was designated a recommended book by the Ministry of Education. Kaze no Matasaburo (Matasaburo of the Wind), made into a film by Nikkatsu and released in October 1940, was the first children's film in Japanese history to be also recommended by the Ministry of Education. Tomita, later over 80 years old, said in an interview that the first Kenji work he came across was this 1940 film. Tomita describes the Kenji works he read as a boy as having a metallic, sparkling quality.

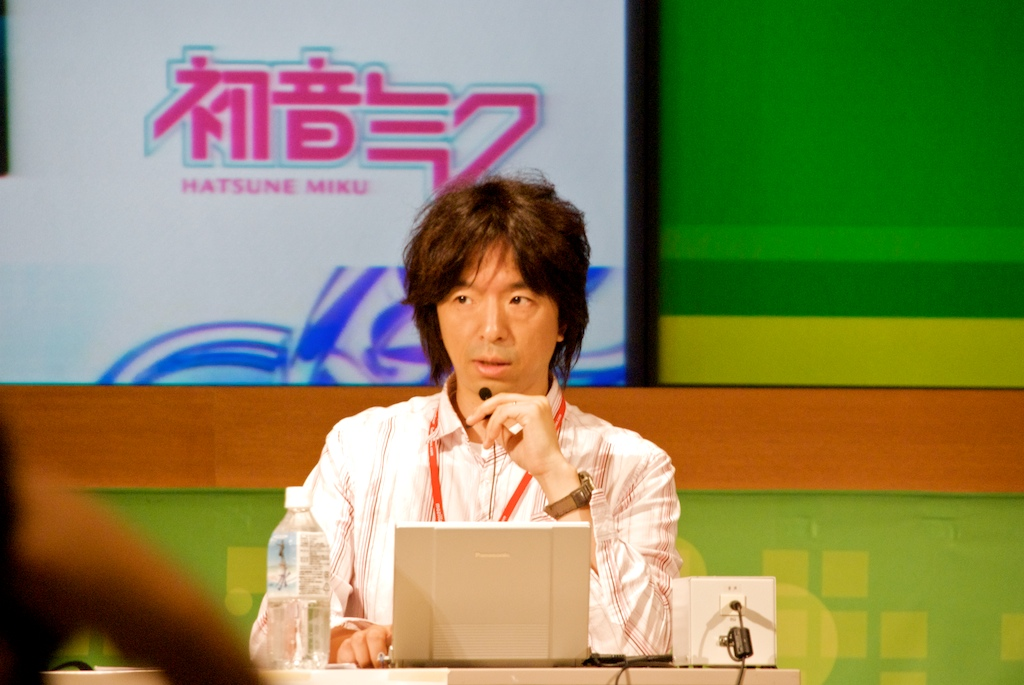
CEO of Crypton Futre Media and the logo of Hatsune Miku

In March 2012, Tomita first met Hatsune Miku, who is a virtual character configured by the system that generates synthetic singing voice developed by Yamaha Corporation and Crypton Future Media in 2007. Ever since he started using Moog synthesizer, Tomita had wanted to get a machine to sing, and he went through a process of trial and error to get a machine to sing. Hatsune Miku had the potential to make his long-held wish come true.

There was another motivation for him composing the symphony. It is the 2011 Tōhoku earthquake and tsunami. Iwate Prefecture, where Kenji envisioned a utopia called Ihatov, suffered great damage from the earthquake. Tomita saw a parallel between the victims of the earthquake and Kenji's younger sister Toshi, who died of illness at a young age.

The composition was completed and premiered in November 2012.

== Instrumentation ==
Symphony Ihatov is scored for a large orchestra, a virtual singer soloist, mixed choir, and children's choir. The virtual singer soloist sings according to the conductor's directions.

== Description ==
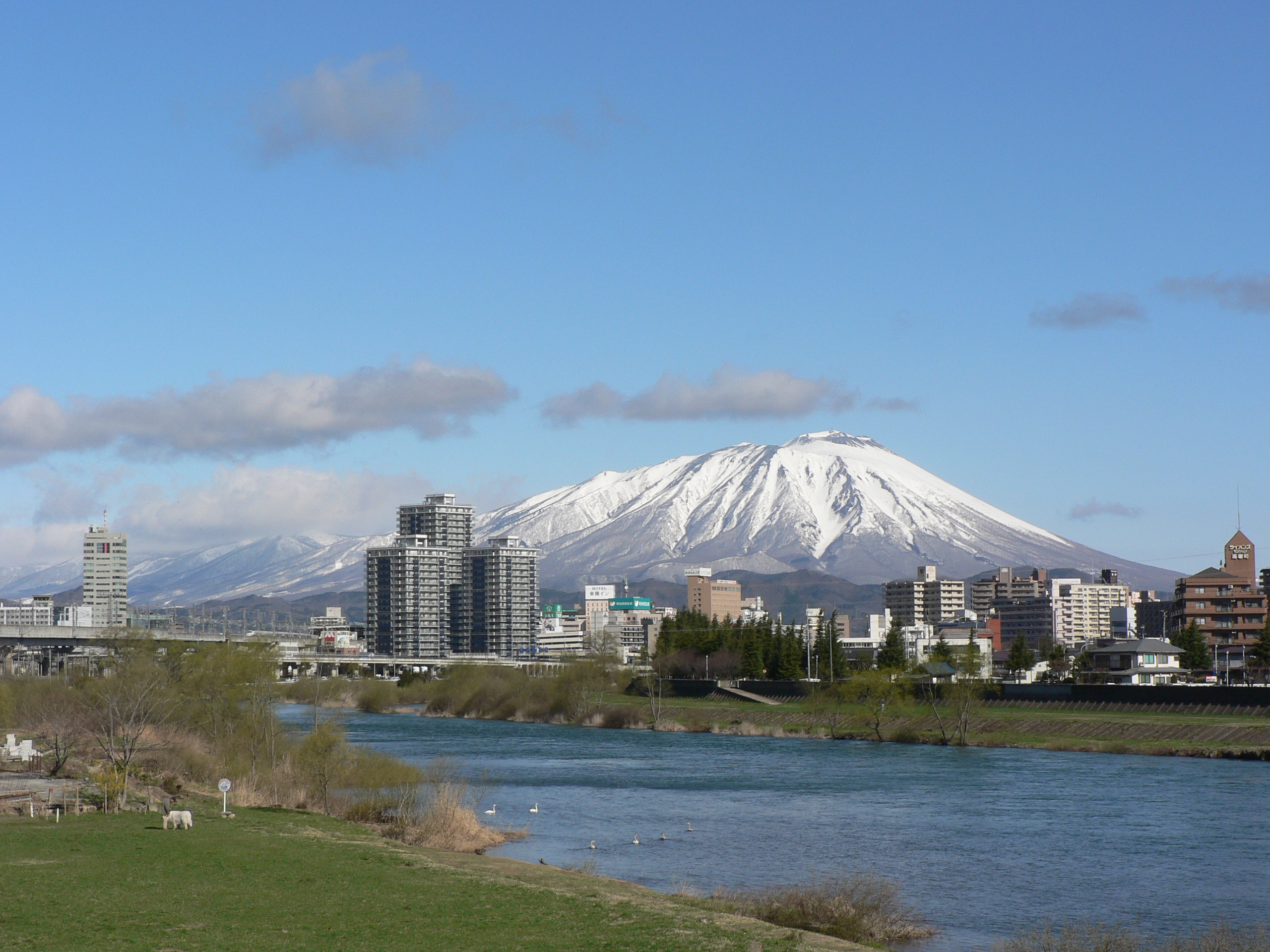
The snow-capped peaks of Mt. Iwate in early spring are affectionately referred to as the "Great Eagle on Mt. Iwate."

Symphony Ihatov consists of seven movements. Each movement has a title, which is taken from the title of one of Kenji's literary works.

1. Great Eagle on Mt. Iwate (Taneyamagahara Idylls)
2. Sword Dance / Song of Circling the Stars
3. Restaurant of Many Orders
4. Matasaburo of the Wind
5. Night on the Galactic Railway
6. Ame ni mo makezu
7. Great Eagle on Mt. Iwate (Taneyamagahara Idylls)

== Premiere ==
Symphony Ihatov premiered at Tokyo Opera City on November 23, 2012, by Japan Philharmonic Orchestra and others with the directions of Naoto Ohtomo. The virtual singer soloist was Hatsune Miku. During the premiere, not only did she sing, her image was also projected onto a screen above the stage, and the performance featured Miku dancing to the music.

As this was the first attempt to have a virtual singer sing and dance in sync with a conductor, there were many difficulties with the synchronization process. Previously, when playing a musical piece using synthetic voice, a human manipulator typically listens to a metronome clock and precisely timed the output of a pre-rendered singing voice synthetic voice to the clock. However, at the premiere, this method was not possible. Therefore, a manupilator sat in front of the conductor and timed the output of the synthetic voice to match the conductor's conducting. However, due to delays within the system, the timing of the sound actually being output was off. Therefore, the manipulator predicted the movement of the baton and output the synthetic voice signal in accordance with the slightest change in the conductor's movement. The music was harmonized by executing the keyboard operations that output the synthetic voice slightly ahead of instructions to the other parts of the orchestra. Instead of the performers performing in time with the output of the synthetic voice, the synthetic voice was a part of the performers, working together with other performers to create a single piece of music. This is different from past musical compositions and is said to be a paradigm shift.

== Reception ==
Music critic Morihide Katayama, who heard the premiere, described this work as an ideal musical adaptation of Kenji's literary works.
