= Isao Tomita =

Japanese composer (1932–2016)

Isao Tomita 冨田 勲
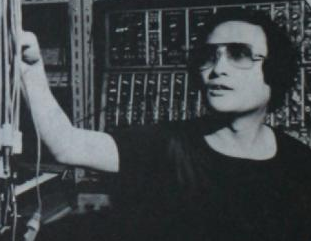
- Isao Tomita in 1977

Background information
- Born: 22 April 1932; Tokyo, Empire of Japan
- Died: 5 May 2016 (aged 84) Tokyo, Japan
- Genres: Ambient, classical, electronic, synth-pop, proto‑trance, space music
- Years active: 1950–2016
- Label: RCA Victor

Isao Tomita (冨田 勲, Tomita Isao; 22 April 1932 – 5 May 2016) (often known simply as Tomita) was a Japanese composer regarded as one of the pioneers of electronic music and space music as well as one of the most famous producers of analog synthesizer arrangements. In addition to creating note-by-note realizations, Tomita made extensive use of the sound-design capabilities of his instrument, using synthesizers to create new sounds to accompany and enhance his electronic realizations of acoustic instruments. He also made effective use of analog music sequencers and the Mellotron, and featured futuristic science-fiction themes, while laying the foundations for synth-pop music and trance-like rhythms. Many of his albums are electronic versions and adaptations of familiar classical music pieces. He received four Grammy Award nominations for his 1974 album based on music by Claude Debussy, Snowflakes Are Dancing.

== Biography ==
=== 1932–1968: Early life and composing career ===
Tomita was born in Tokyo and spent his early childhood with his father in China. After returning to Japan, he took private lessons in orchestration and composition while an art history student at Keio University, Tokyo. He graduated in 1955 and became a full-time composer for television, film and theatre. He composed the theme music for the Japanese Olympic gymnastics team for the 1956 Summer Olympics in Melbourne, Australia.

During the 1960s, Tomita worked for Osamu Tezuka to compose music for many of Tezuka's animated TV programs and experimental films, some of these are Galaxy Boy Troop, Big X, Pictures at an Exhibition, Princess Knight, New Treasure Island (unrelated to the 1947 manga), Mermaid, Dororo, A Thousand and One Nights, and many others. In 1965, Tomita wrote music for Tezuka's Kimba the White Lion, but the American-English version had a different theme by Bernie Baum, Bill Giant and Florence Kaye. In the same year he scored the original Japanese version of Gulliver's Travels Beyond the Moon, but the film was re-scored by Milton DeLugg when it was dubbed into English.

In 1966, he wrote a tone poem based on Kimba the White Lion, and an original video animation synchronized to this tone poem was released in 1991. With Kunio Miyauchi, he created the music for the tokusatsu science fiction/espionage/action television series Mighty Jack, which aired in 1968. The same year, he co-founded Group TAC.

=== 1969-1979: Electronic music ===
In the late 1960s, Tomita turned to electronic music with the impetus of Wendy Carlos and Robert Moog's work with synthesizers. He acquired a Moog III synthesizer and began building his home studio. He eventually realized that synthesizers could be used to create entirely new sounds in addition to mimicking other instruments. His first electronic album was Electric Samurai: Switched on Rock, released in Japan in 1972 and in the United States in 1974. The album featured electronic renditions of contemporary rock and pop songs, while utilizing speech synthesis in place of a human voice.

Tomita then started arranging Claude Debussy's impressionist pieces for synthesizer and, in 1974, released the album Snowflakes Are Dancing; it became a worldwide success and was responsible for popularizing several aspects of synthesizer programming. It was the top-selling classical music album for that year. The album's contents included ambience, realistic string simulations, an early attempt to synthesize the sound of a symphony orchestra, whistles, and abstract bell-like sounds, as well as a number of processing effects including reverberation, phase shifting, flanging, and ring modulation. Quadraphonic versions of the album provided a spatial audio effect using four speakers. A particularly significant achievement was its polyphonic sound, created prior to the era of polyphonic synthesizers. Tomita created the album's polyphony as Carlos had done before him, with the use of multitrack recording, recording each voice of a piece one at a time, on a separate tape track, and then mixing the result to stereo or quad. It took 14 months to produce the album.

In his early albums, Tomita also made effective use of analog music sequencers, which he used for pitch, filter or effects changes and processed Mellotron sounds - especially 8 Voice Choir, creating quite stunning ethereal effects. Tomita's modular human whistle sounds would also be copied in the presets of later electronic instruments. His version of "Arabesque No. 1" was later used as the theme to the astronomy television series Jack Horkheimer: Star Gazer (originally titled Star Hustler) seen on most PBS stations in the United States; in Japan, parts of his version of "Rêverie" were used for the opening and closing of Fuji Television's transmissions; in Catalonia, "Arabesque No. 1" was also used for the intro and the outro for the children TV 1983 program Planeta imaginari ("imaginary planet").

Following the success of Snowflakes Are Dancing (1974), Tomita released a number of "classically" themed albums, including arrangements of: Igor Stravinsky's The Firebird (1976), Modest Mussorgsky's Pictures at an Exhibition (1976), and Gustav Holst's The Planets (1976). Holst: The Planets introduced a science fiction "space theme". This album sparked controversy on its release, as Imogen Holst, daughter of Gustav Holst, refused permission for her father's work to be interpreted in this way.

1978's Kosmos featured his renditions of Arthur Honegger's Pacific 231, Charles Ives's The Unanswered Question and the Star Wars theme. "The Sea Named 'Solaris'" was inspired by the science fiction film Solaris. He explained "The sea of Solaris extracts memories from the sleeping earthmen's brains and reincarnate loved ones from their past. I did not try to express the planet Solaris itself but a certain state of a human mind that might be created by the happenings there. The cherished memories are depicted by Bach's Invention, and the eternal longing is expressed by Bach's chorale I Call to Thee, Lord Jesus Christ."

While working on his classical synthesizer albums, Tomita also composed numerous scores for Japanese television and films, including the Zatoichi television series, two Zatoichi feature films, the Oshi Samurai (Mute Samurai) television series and the Toho science fiction disaster film, Catastrophe 1999, The Prophesies of Nostradamus (U.S. title: Last Days of Planet Earth) in 1974. The latter blends synthesizer performances with pop-rock and orchestral instruments. It and a few other partial and complete scores of the period have been released on LP and later CD over the years in Japan. While not bootlegs, at least some of these releases were issued by film and television production companies without Tomita's artistic approval.

=== 1980-2000: SoundCloud concerts ===
In 1984, Tomita released Canon of the Three Stars, which featured classical pieces renamed for astronomical objects. For example, the title piece is his version of Pachelbel's Canon in D Major. He credits himself with "The Plasma Symphony Orchestra", which was a computer synthesizer process using the wave forms of electromagnetic emanations from various stars and constellations for the sonic textures of this album.

Tomita performed a number of outdoor "SoundCloud" concerts, with speakers surrounding the audience in a "cloud of sound". He gave a big concert in 1984 at the annual contemporary music Ars Electronica festival in Linz, Austria called Mind of the Universe, mixing tracks live in a glass pyramid suspended over an audience of 80,000 people. He also performed another two special concerts in 1986 to celebrate the Statue of Liberty centennial (Back to the Earth) as well another one in Sydney on 1 January 1988 produced to celebrate Australia's bicentenary as unifield country. The Australian performance was part of a A$7 million gift from Japan to the country, which included the largest fireworks display up to that time: six fixed sound and lighting systems — one of those on a moored barge in the centre of the Sydney Harbour, another one was flown by Chinook helicopter during the relevant parts of the show. A fleet of barges with Japanese cultural performances, including a boat parade in which a kabuki theater performance was staged.passed by at various times. His last SoundCloud event was in Nagoya, Japan in 1997, featuring guest performances by The Manhattan Transfer, Ray Charles, Dionne Warwick, and Rick Wakeman.

In the late 1990s, he composed a symphonic fantasy for orchestra and synthesizer titled The Tale of Genji, inspired by the eponymous 11th-century Japanese story. It was performed by symphony orchestras in Tokyo, Los Angeles, and London. A live concert CD version was released in 1999 followed by a studio version in 2000.

=== 2001–2016: Later years ===
In 2001, Tomita collaborated with The Walt Disney Company to compose the background atmosphere music for the AquaSphere entrance at the Tokyo DisneySea theme park outside Tokyo. Tomita followed this with a synthesizer score featuring acoustic soloists for the 2002 film The Twilight Samurai (たそがれ清兵衛, Tasogare Seibei), which won the 2003 Japanese Academy Award for Outstanding Achievement in Music.

The advent of the DVD-Audio format allowed Tomita to further pursue his interests in multichannel audio with reworked releases of The Tale of Genji Symphonic Fantasy and The Tomita Planets 2003. He also performed a version of Claude Debussy's "Clair de lune" for the soundtrack of Ocean's 13 in 2007.

In 2012, Tomita performed Symphony Ihatov in Tokyo, directing the Japan Philharmonic, an accompanying choir, and featuring cyber-celebrity/diva, Hatsune Miku, a digital avatar created by the Japanese company Crypton Future Media.

In 2015, a number of tracks from Snowflakes are Dancing were featured on the soundtrack to Heaven Knows What, an American film directed by the Safdie brothers. The same year, in recognition of his long career and global influence on electronic music, Tomita won the Japan Foundation Award, an award launched "to honor individuals or organizations who have made a significant contribution to promoting understanding and friendship between Japan and the rest of the world through academic, artistic and other cultural pursuits".

=== Death ===
After having heart disease for many years, Tomita died of heart failure in Tokyo on 5 May 2016.

== Legacy ==
Tomita is considered to be a pioneer in electronic music, but his influence spread beyond the genre both in Japan and overseas. In 1984, Stevie Wonder cited Tomita as one of the artists he respected most and a major influence exploring classical composers like Mussorgsky and Debussy. In 1987, Michael Jackson toured Tomita's home studio.

Tomita's music was featured during the opening and closing ceremonies of the 2020 Tokyo Olympic Games. "Rise of the Planet 9" from Dr. Copellius composed by Tomita was played during the cauldron lighting in the opening ceremony, while the Debussy piece "Moonlight" arranged by Tomita was played during the extinguishing of the torch in the closing ceremony.

== Discography ==
=== Studio albums ===
- Switched on Hit & Rock (1972) (as Electric Samurai)
- Snowflakes Are Dancing (1974) US #57 Can #57
- Pictures at an Exhibition (1975) US #49 Can #55
- Firebird (1976) US #71 Can #88
- Holst: The Planets (1976) US #67
- The Bermuda Triangle (1978) US #152
- Kosmos also known as Cosmos and Space Fantasy (1978) US #115
- Daphnis et Chloé, also known as Bolero and The Ravel Album (1979) US #174
- Grand Canyon (1982)
- Dawn Chorus, also known as Canon of the Three Stars (1984)
- Nasca Fantasy (1994) (supporting Kodō)
- Bach Fantasy (1996)
- The Tale of Genji Symphonic Fantasy (2000)
- The Planets 2003 (2003, DVD-A only)
- The Bermuda Triangle Japanese version CD (バミューダトリアングル) (2004)
- Planets: Ultimate Edition (2011, re-recording with an additional movement and featuring bonus tracks to the album from 1976 to 2011)
- The Tale of Genji Symphonic Fantasy Ultimate edition (2011, new recording with new movements)
- Clair de Lune - Ultimate Edition (2012, revised and expanded Snowflakes Are Dancing)
- Symphony Ihatov (2013)
- Pictures at an Exhibition - Ultimate Edition - (2014, revised and expanded)
- Space Fantasy (2015, revised and expanded Kosmos)
- Okhotsk Fantasy (2016)

=== Live albums ===
- The Mind of the Universe - Live at Linz (1985)
- Back to the Earth - Live in New York (1988)
- Hansel und Gretel (Laserdisc-only 1993)
- The Tale of Genji (1999)
- Planet Zero (2011)
- Dr. Coppelius (2017, with Tokyo Philharmonic Orchestra)

=== Compilation albums ===
- Sound Creature (1977, demonstration/education album with part unreleased material)
- Tomita's Greatest Hits (1979)
- A Voyage Through His Greatest Hits, Vol. 2 (1981)
- The Best of Tomita (1984)
- Space Walk - Impressions of an Astronaut (1984) RCA Records, USA
- Tomita on NHK (2003)
- Tomita Different Dimensions (1997)

=== Soundtracks ===
- Gulliver's Travels Beyond the Moon (1965, no soundtrack album) Japanese version
- Jungle Emperor Symphonic Poem (1966, 2009 re-recording, orchestral suite based on the TV series)
- Zatoichi Goes to the Fire Festival (1970)
- Catastrophe 1999: Prophecies of Nostradamus (1974)
- Demon Pond (1979, no soundtrack album)
- Misty Kid of Wind (1989)
- Storm from the East (1992)
- A Class to Remember (1993)
- Shin Nihon Kikou (Tomita supervised re-recordings of various TV scores 1994)
- First Emperor (1994) (as musical supervisor)
- Gakko II (1996)
- Jungle Emperor Leo (1997)
- 21 seiki e no densetsushi Shigeo Nagashima (2000)
- Sennen no Koi Story of Genji (2001)
- Tokyo Disney Sea Aquasphere Theme Music (2002)
- The Twilight Samurai (2002)
- The Hidden Blade (2004)
- Blood Will Tell (2004)
- Black Jack: The Two Doctors of Darkness (2005)
- Love and Honor (2006)
- Kabei: Our Mother (2008)
- Welcome Home, Hayabusa (2012)
- Isao Tomita Tezuka Osamu's Work Selection of Music (2016) (compilation CD release in Japan)

== Honours ==
- Order of the Rising Sun, 4th Class, Gold Rays with Rosette (2003)

== See also ==
- Hideki Matsutake, Tomita's assistant and supporting member of Yellow Magic Orchestra
- "Atimot ot Edo", a song title and anadrome of "Ode to Tomita"
