= Sazeray =

- Commune
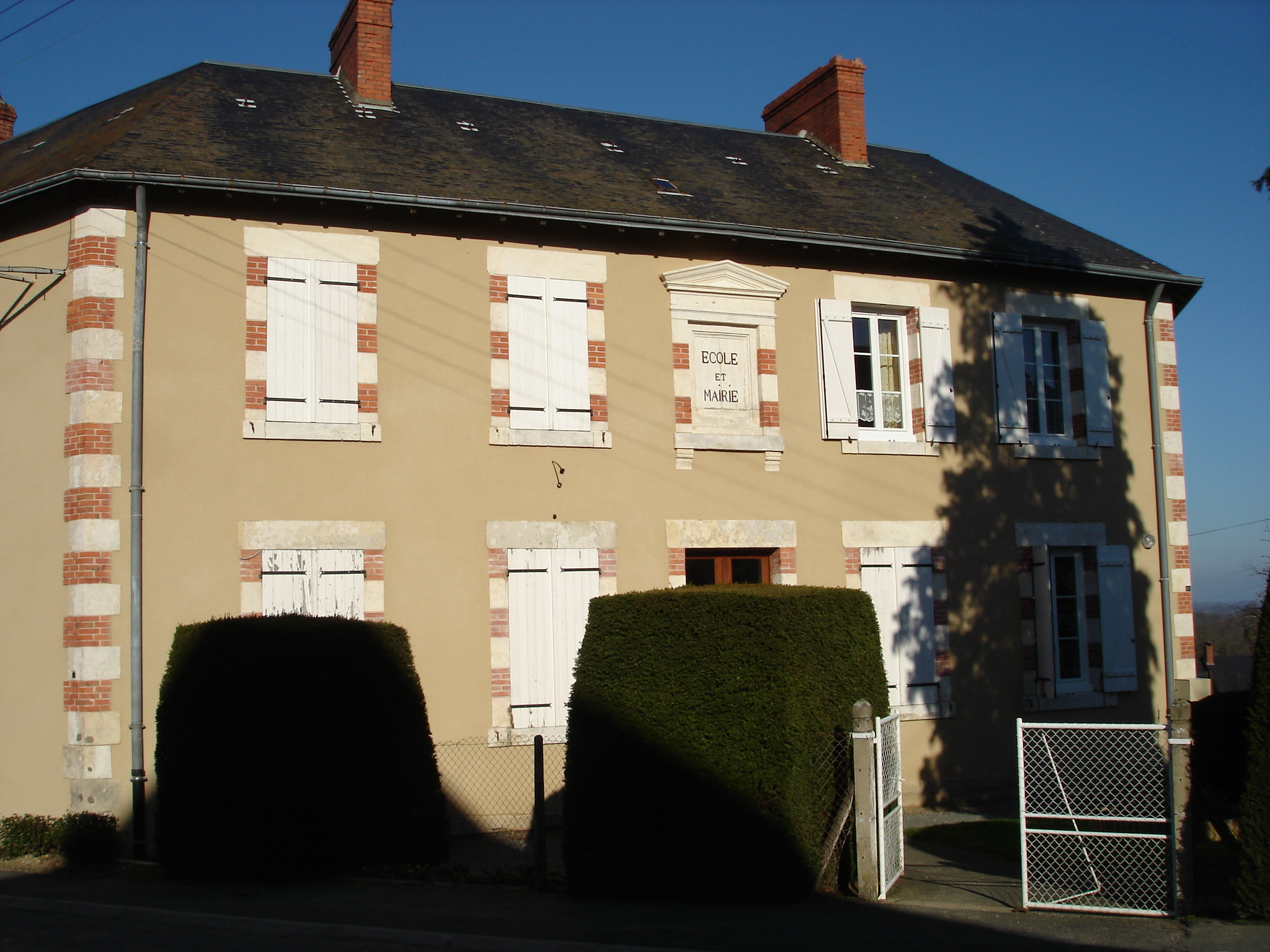
- The town hall in Sazeray
- Location of Sazeray
- Location within France Location within Centre-Val de Loire
- Coordinates: 46°25′47″N 2°03′18″E
- Country: France
- Region: Centre-Val de Loire
- Department: Indre
- Arrondissement: La Châtre
- Canton: La Châtre

Government
  - Mayor (2020–2026): Didier Brunet
- Area^{1}: 22.69 km^{2} (8.76 sq mi)
- Elevation: 438 m (1,437 ft)
- Highest elevation: 432 m (1,417 ft)
- Lowest elevation: 260 m (850 ft)
- Population (2023): 291
  - Density: 12.8/km^{2} (33.2/sq mi)
- Time zone: UTC+01:00 (CET)
  - Summer (DST): UTC+02:00 (CEST)
- INSEE/Postal code: 36214 /36160
- ^{1} French Land Register data, which excludes lakes, ponds, glaciers > 1 km^{2} (0.386 sq mi or 247 acres) and river estuaries.

Sazeray (French pronunciation: [sazʁɛ]) is a commune in the Indre department in central France, in the region of Centre-Val de Loire.

== Geography ==
=== Location ===
The commune is situated in the southwest of the department, at the border with the department of Creuse. Nearby communes include Vigoulant, Tercillat, La Cellette, Nouziers, Pouligny Notre-Dame, and Sainte-Sévère-sur-Indre.

=== Hamlets and lieux-dits ===
The commune's hamlets and lieux-dits are la Crie, le Grand Correix, and Villard.

== Population ==
Historical population
Year	Pop.	±% p.a.
1968	607	—
1975	524	−2.08%
1982	447	−2.24%
1990	370	−2.34%
1999	319	−1.63%
2007	326	+0.27%
2012	320	−0.37%
2017	302	−1.15%
2023	291	−0.62%
Source: INSEE

== See also ==
- Communes of the Indre department
