= Arrondissement of La Châtre =

Coordinates: 46.58°N 1.98°E

La Châtre
- Arrondissement
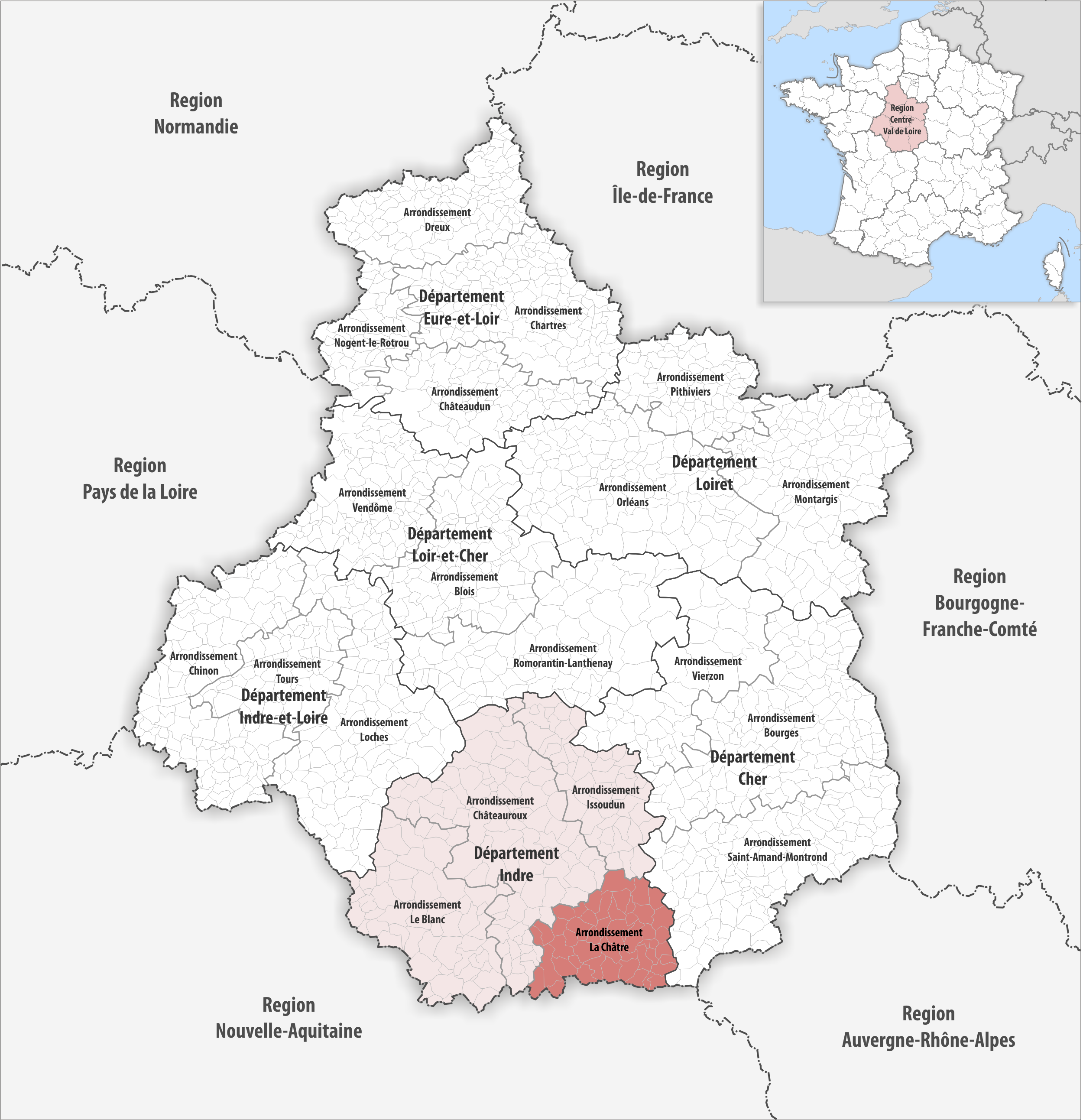
- Location within the region Centre-Val de Loire
- Country: France
- Region: Centre-Val de Loire
- Department: Indre
- No. of communes: {{{nbcomm}}}
- Area: 1,204.2 km^{2} (464.9 sq mi)
- Population (2023): 27,440
  - Density: 22.79/km^{2} (59.02/sq mi)
- INSEE code: 363

The arrondissement of La Châtre is an arrondissement of France in the Indre department in the Centre-Val de Loire region. It has 51 communes. Its population is 27,656 (2021), and its area is 1,204.2 km^{2} (464.9 sq mi).

== Composition ==
The communes of the arrondissement of La Châtre, and their INSEE codes, are:

1. Aigurande (36001)
2. La Berthenoux (36017)
3. Briantes (36025)
4. La Buxerette (36028)
5. Buxières-d'Aillac (36030)
6. Champillet (36038)
7. Chassignolles (36043)
8. La Châtre (36046)
9. Cluis (36056)
10. Crevant (36060)
11. Crozon-sur-Vauvre (36061)
12. Feusines (36073)
13. Fougerolles (36078)
14. Gournay (36084)
15. Lacs (36091)
16. Lignerolles (36095)
17. Lourdoueix-Saint-Michel (36099)
18. Lourouer-Saint-Laurent (36100)
19. Lys-Saint-Georges (36108)
20. Le Magny (36109)
21. Maillet (36110)
22. Malicornay (36111)
23. Mers-sur-Indre (36120)
24. Montchevrier (36126)
25. Montgivray (36127)
26. Montipouret (36129)
27. Montlevicq (36130)
28. La Motte-Feuilly (36132)
29. Mouhers (36133)
30. Néret (36138)
31. Neuvy-Saint-Sépulchre (36141)
32. Nohant-Vic (36143)
33. Orsennes (36146)
34. Pérassay (36156)
35. Pouligny-Notre-Dame (36163)
36. Pouligny-Saint-Martin (36164)
37. Saint-Août (36180)
38. Saint-Chartier (36184)
39. Saint-Christophe-en-Boucherie (36186)
40. Saint-Denis-de-Jouhet (36189)
41. Sainte-Sévère-sur-Indre (36208)
42. Saint-Plantaire (36207)
43. Sarzay (36210)
44. Sazeray (36214)
45. Thevet-Saint-Julien (36221)
46. Tranzault (36226)
47. Urciers (36227)
48. Verneuil-sur-Igneraie (36234)
49. Vicq-Exemplet (36236)
50. Vigoulant (36238)
51. Vijon (36240)

== History ==
The arrondissement of La Châtre was created in 1800. At the January 2017 reorganisation of the arrondissements of Indre, it gained one commune from the arrondissement of Châteauroux, and it lost eight communes to the arrondissement of Châteauroux.

As a result of the reorganisation of the cantons of France which came into effect in 2015, the borders of the cantons are no longer related to the borders of the arrondissements. The cantons of the arrondissement of La Châtre were, as of January 2015:

1. Aigurande
2. La Châtre
3. Éguzon-Chantôme
4. Neuvy-Saint-Sépulchre
5. Sainte-Sévère-sur-Indre
