= Thizay =

Thizay may refer to the following places in France:

- Thizay, Indre, a commune in the Indre department
- Thizay, Indre-et-Loire, a commune in the Indre-et-Loire department
