= Montlevicq =

- Commune
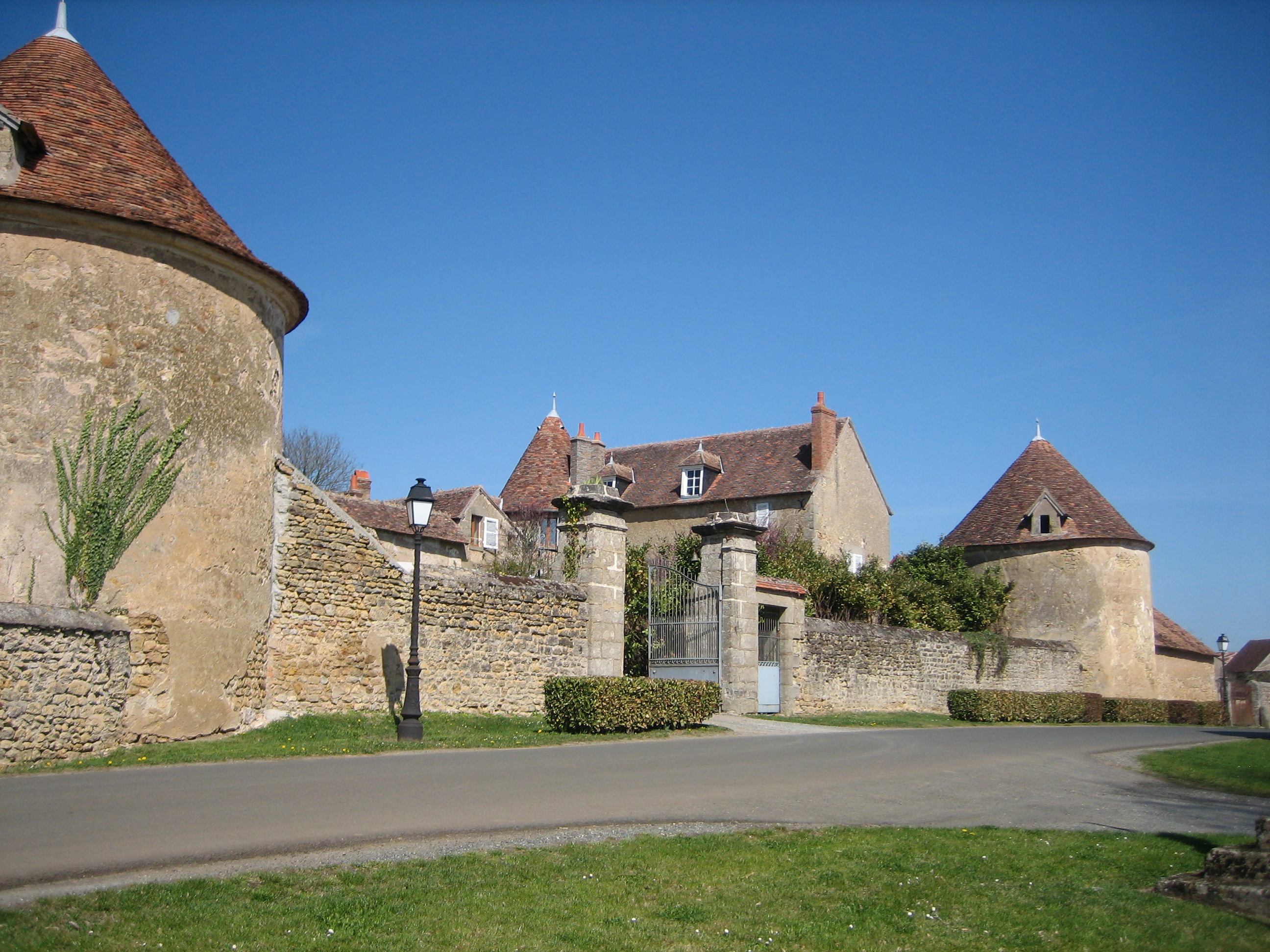
- Chateau
- Location of Montlevicq
- Location within France Location within Centre-Val de Loire
- Coordinates: 46°34′41″N 2°04′15″E
- Country: France
- Region: Centre-Val de Loire
- Department: Indre
- Arrondissement: La Châtre
- Canton: La Châtre

Government
  - Mayor (2020–2026): Claude Alapetite
- Area^{1}: 18.79 km^{2} (7.25 sq mi)
- Elevation: 200 m (660 ft)
- Highest elevation: 263 m (863 ft)
- Lowest elevation: 207 m (679 ft)
- Population (2023): 106
  - Density: 5.64/km^{2} (14.6/sq mi)
- Time zone: UTC+01:00 (CET)
  - Summer (DST): UTC+02:00 (CEST)
- INSEE/Postal code: 36130 /36400
- ^{1} French Land Register data, which excludes lakes, ponds, glaciers > 1 km^{2} (0.386 sq mi or 247 acres) and river estuaries.

Montlevicq (French pronunciation: [mɔ̃ləvik]) is a commune in the Indre department in central France.

== Population ==
Historical population
Year	Pop.	±% p.a.
1968	205	—
1975	160	−3.48%
1982	164	+0.35%
1990	129	−2.96%
1999	116	−1.17%
2007	104	−1.36%
2012	101	−0.58%
2017	115	+2.63%
2023	106	−1.35%
Source: INSEE

== See also ==
- Communes of the Indre department
