= Communes of the Indre department =

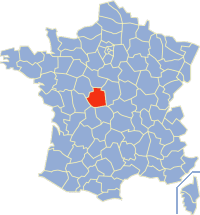

The following is a list of the 241 communes of the Indre department of France.

The communes cooperate in the following intercommunalities (as of 2025):

- Communauté d'agglomération Châteauroux Métropole
- Communauté de communes Brenne-Val de Creuse
- Communauté de communes Chabris-Pays de Bazelle
- Communauté de communes Champagne Boischauts
- Communauté de communes du Châtillonnais en Berry
- Communauté de communes de La Châtre et Sainte-Sévère
- Communauté de communes Cœur de Brenne
- Communauté de communes Écueillé-Valençay
- Communauté de communes Éguzon-Argenton-Vallée de la Creuse
- Communauté de communes Levroux Boischaut Champagne
- Communauté de communes de la Marche Berrichonne
- Communauté de communes Marche Occitane-Val d'Anglin
- Communauté de communes du Pays d'Issoudun (partly)
- Communauté de communes du Val de Bouzanne
- Communauté de communes Val de l'Indre-Brenne

INSEE code	Postal code	Commune
36001	36140	Aigurande
36002	36150	Aize
36003	36120	Ambrault
36004	36210	Anjouin
36005	36120	Ardentes
36006	36200	Argenton-sur-Creuse
36007	36500	Argy
36008	36700	Arpheuilles
36009	36330	Arthon
36010	36290	Azay-le-Ferron
36158	36200	Badecon-le-Pin
36011	36210	Bagneux
36012	36270	Baraize
36013	36110	Baudres
36014	36270	Bazaiges
36015	36310	Beaulieu
36016	36370	Bélâbre
36017	36400	La Berthenoux
36018	36300	Le Blanc
36019	36120	Bommiers
36020	36310	Bonneuil
36021	36100	Les Bordes
36022	36200	Bouesse
36023	36110	Bouges-le-Château
36024	36110	Bretagne
36025	36400	Briantes
36026	36110	Brion
36027	36100	Brives
36028	36140	La Buxerette
36029	36150	Buxeuil
36030	36230	Buxières-d'Aillac
36031	36500	Buzançais
36032	36200	Ceaulmont
36033	36200	Celon
36034	36210	Chabris
36035	36310	Chaillac
36036	36370	Chalais
36037	36100	La Champenoise
36038	36160	Champillet
36040	36500	La Chapelle-Orthemale
36041	36150	La Chapelle-Saint-Laurian
36042	36800	Chasseneuil
36043	36400	Chassignolles
36044	36000	Châteauroux
36045	36700	Châtillon-sur-Indre
36046	36400	La Châtre
36047	36170	La Châtre-Langlin
36048	36200	Chavin
36049	36170	Chazelet
36050	36500	Chezelles
36051	36800	Chitray
36052	36100	Chouday
36053	36300	Ciron
36054	36700	Cléré-du-Bois
36055	36700	Clion
36056	36340	Cluis
36057	36130	Coings
36058	36300	Concremiers
36059	36100	Condé
36060	36140	Crevant
36061	36140	Crozon-sur-Vauvre
36062	36190	Cuzion
36063	36130	Déols
36064	36130	Diors
36065	36260	Diou
36066	36300	Douadic
36067	36310	Dunet
36068	36210	Dun-le-Poëlier
36069	36240	Écueillé
36070	36270	Éguzon-Chantôme
36071	36120	Étrechet
36073	36160	Feusines
36074	36700	Fléré-la-Rivière
36075	36150	Fontenay
36076	36220	Fontgombault
36077	36600	Fontguenand
36078	36230	Fougerolles
36079	36110	Francillon
36080	36180	Frédille
36081	36190	Gargilesse-Dampierre
36082	36240	Gehée
36083	36150	Giroux
36084	36230	Gournay
36085	36150	Guilly
36086	36180	Heugnes
36087	36300	Ingrandes
36088	36100	Issoudun
36089	36120	Jeu-les-Bois
36090	36240	Jeu-Maloches
36091	36400	Lacs
36092	36600	Langé
36093	36110	Levroux
36094	36370	Lignac
36095	36160	Lignerolles
36096	36220	Lingé
36097	36150	Liniez
36098	36100	Lizeray
36099	36140	Lourdoueix-Saint-Michel
36100	36400	Lourouer-Saint-Laurent
36101	36350	Luant
36102	36150	Luçay-le-Libre
36103	36360	Luçay-le-Mâle
36104	36220	Lurais
36105	36220	Lureuil
36106	36800	Luzeret
36107	36600	Lye
36108	36230	Lys-Saint-Georges
36109	36400	Le Magny
36110	36340	Maillet
36111	36340	Malicornay
36112	36120	Mâron
36113	36220	Martizay
36114	36370	Mauvières
36115	36210	Menetou-sur-Nahon
36116	36150	Ménétréols-sous-Vatan
36117	36200	Le Menoux
36118	36500	Méobecq
36119	36220	Mérigny
36120	36230	Mers-sur-Indre
36121	36100	Meunet-Planches
36122	36150	Meunet-sur-Vatan
36123	36290	Mézières-en-Brenne
36124	36800	Migné

INSEE code	Postal code	Commune
36125	36260	Migny
36126	36140	Montchevrier
36127	36400	Montgivray
36128	36130	Montierchaume
36129	36230	Montipouret
36130	36400	Montlevicq
36131	36200	Mosnay
36132	36160	La Motte-Feuilly
36133	36340	Mouhers
36134	36170	Mouhet
36135	36110	Moulins-sur-Céphons
36136	36700	Murs
36137	36220	Néons-sur-Creuse
36138	36400	Néret
36139	36500	Neuillay-les-Bois
36140	36100	Neuvy-Pailloux
36141	36230	Neuvy-Saint-Sépulchre
36142	36250	Niherne
36143	36400	Nohant-Vic
36144	36800	Nuret-le-Ferron
36145	36290	Obterre
36146	36190	Orsennes
36147	36210	Orville
36148	36800	Oulches
36149	36500	Palluau-sur-Indre
36150	36170	Parnac
36152	36260	Paudy
36153	36290	Paulnay
36154	36200	Le Pêchereau
36155	36180	Pellevoisin
36156	36160	Pérassay
36157	36350	La Pérouille
36159	36330	Le Poinçonnet
36160	36190	Pommiers
36161	36800	Le Pont-Chrétien-Chabenet
36162	36210	Poulaines
36163	36160	Pouligny-Notre-Dame
36164	36160	Pouligny-Saint-Martin
36165	36300	Pouligny-Saint-Pierre
36166	36240	Préaux
36167	36220	Preuilly-la-Ville
36168	36370	Prissac
36169	36120	Pruniers
36170	36150	Reboursin
36171	36260	Reuilly
36172	36800	Rivarennes
36173	36300	Rosnay
36174	36170	Roussines
36175	36110	Rouvres-les-Bois
36176	36300	Ruffec
36177	36170	Sacierges-Saint-Martin
36178	36300	Saint-Aigny
36179	36100	Saint-Aoustrille
36180	36120	Saint-Août
36181	36100	Saint-Aubin
36182	36170	Saint-Benoît-du-Sault
36184	36400	Saint-Chartier
36185	36210	Saint-Christophe-en-Bazelle
36186	36400	Saint-Christophe-en-Boucherie
36187	36170	Saint-Civran
36188	36700	Saint-Cyran-du-Jambot
36189	36230	Saint-Denis-de-Jouhet
36190	36100	Sainte-Fauste
36193	36500	Sainte-Gemme
36199	36260	Sainte-Lizaigne
36208	36160	Sainte-Sévère-sur-Indre
36191	36150	Saint-Florentin
36192	36800	Saint-Gaultier
36194	36500	Saint-Genou
36195	36100	Saint-Georges-sur-Arnon
36196	36170	Saint-Gilles
36197	36370	Saint-Hilaire-sur-Benaize
36198	36500	Saint-Lactencin
36200	36200	Saint-Marcel
36202	36250	Saint-Maur
36203	36700	Saint-Médard
36204	36290	Saint-Michel-en-Brenne
36205	36260	Saint-Pierre-de-Jards
36207	36190	Saint-Plantaire
36209	36100	Saint-Valentin
36210	36230	Sarzay
36211	36120	Sassierges-Saint-Germain
36212	36290	Saulnay
36213	36220	Sauzelles
36214	36160	Sazeray
36215	36100	Ségry
36216	36180	Selles-sur-Nahon
36217	36210	Sembleçay
36218	36500	Sougé
36219	36200	Tendu
36220	36800	Thenay
36221	36400	Thevet-Saint-Julien
36222	36100	Thizay
36223	36310	Tilly
36224	36220	Tournon-Saint-Martin
36225	36700	Le Tranger
36226	36230	Tranzault
36227	36160	Urciers
36228	36600	Valençay
36229	36210	Val-Fouzon
36230	36150	Vatan
36231	36330	Velles
36232	36500	Vendœuvres
36233	36600	La Vernelle
36234	36400	Verneuil-sur-Igneraie
36235	36600	Veuil
36236	36400	Vicq-Exemplet
36237	36600	Vicq-sur-Nahon
36238	36160	Vigoulant
36239	36170	Vigoux
36240	36160	Vijon
36241	36320	Villedieu-sur-Indre
36242	36110	Villegongis
36243	36500	Villegouin
36244	36600	Villentrois-Faverolles-en-Berry
36246	36290	Villiers
36247	36110	Vineuil
36248	36100	Vouillon
