= Saint-Christophe-en-Boucherie =

- Commune
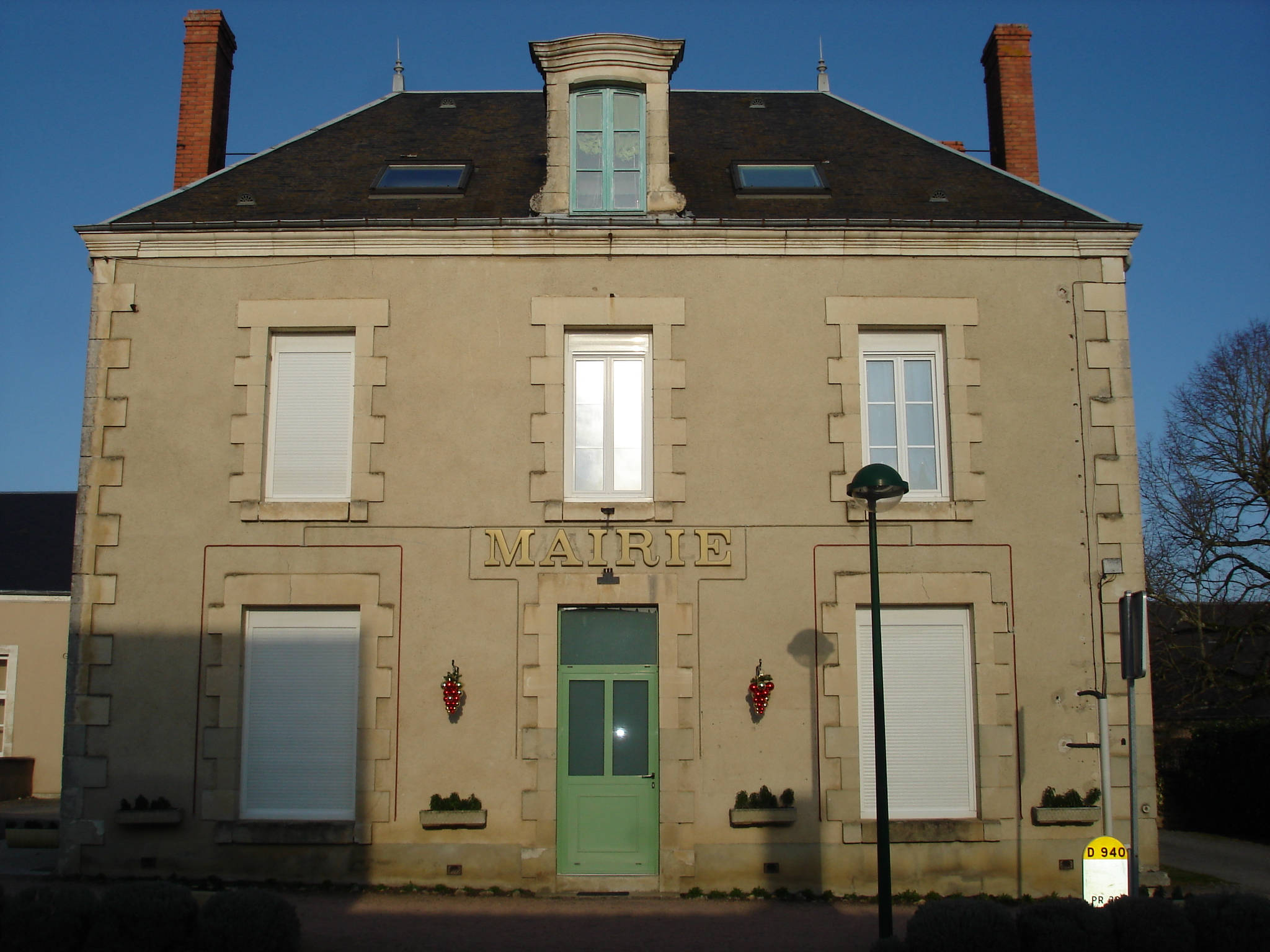
- The town hall in Saint-Christophe-en-Boucherie
- Location of Saint-Christophe-en-Boucherie
- Location within France Location within Centre-Val de Loire
- Coordinates: 46°40′45″N 2°07′19″E
- Country: France
- Region: Centre-Val de Loire
- Department: Indre
- Arrondissement: La Châtre
- Canton: La Châtre

Government
  - Mayor (2020–2026): Jean-Luc Mançois
- Area^{1}: 26.89 km^{2} (10.38 sq mi)
- Elevation: 268 m (879 ft)
- Highest elevation: 274 m (899 ft)
- Lowest elevation: 191 m (627 ft)
- Population (2023): 232
  - Density: 8.63/km^{2} (22.3/sq mi)
- Time zone: UTC+01:00 (CET)
  - Summer (DST): UTC+02:00 (CEST)
- INSEE/Postal code: 36186 /36400
- ^{1} French Land Register data, which excludes lakes, ponds, glaciers > 1 km^{2} (0.386 sq mi or 247 acres) and river estuaries.

Saint-Christophe-en-Boucherie (French pronunciation: [sɛ̃ kʁistɔf ɑ̃ buʃʁi]) is a commune in the Indre department in central France.

== Population ==
Historical population
Year	Pop.	±% p.a.
1968	412	—
1975	342	−2.63%
1982	308	−1.48%
1990	277	−1.32%
1999	246	−1.31%
2007	252	+0.30%
2012	245	−0.56%
2017	257	+0.96%
2023	232	−1.69%
Source: INSEE

== See also ==
- Communes of the Indre department
