= Malicornay =

- Commune
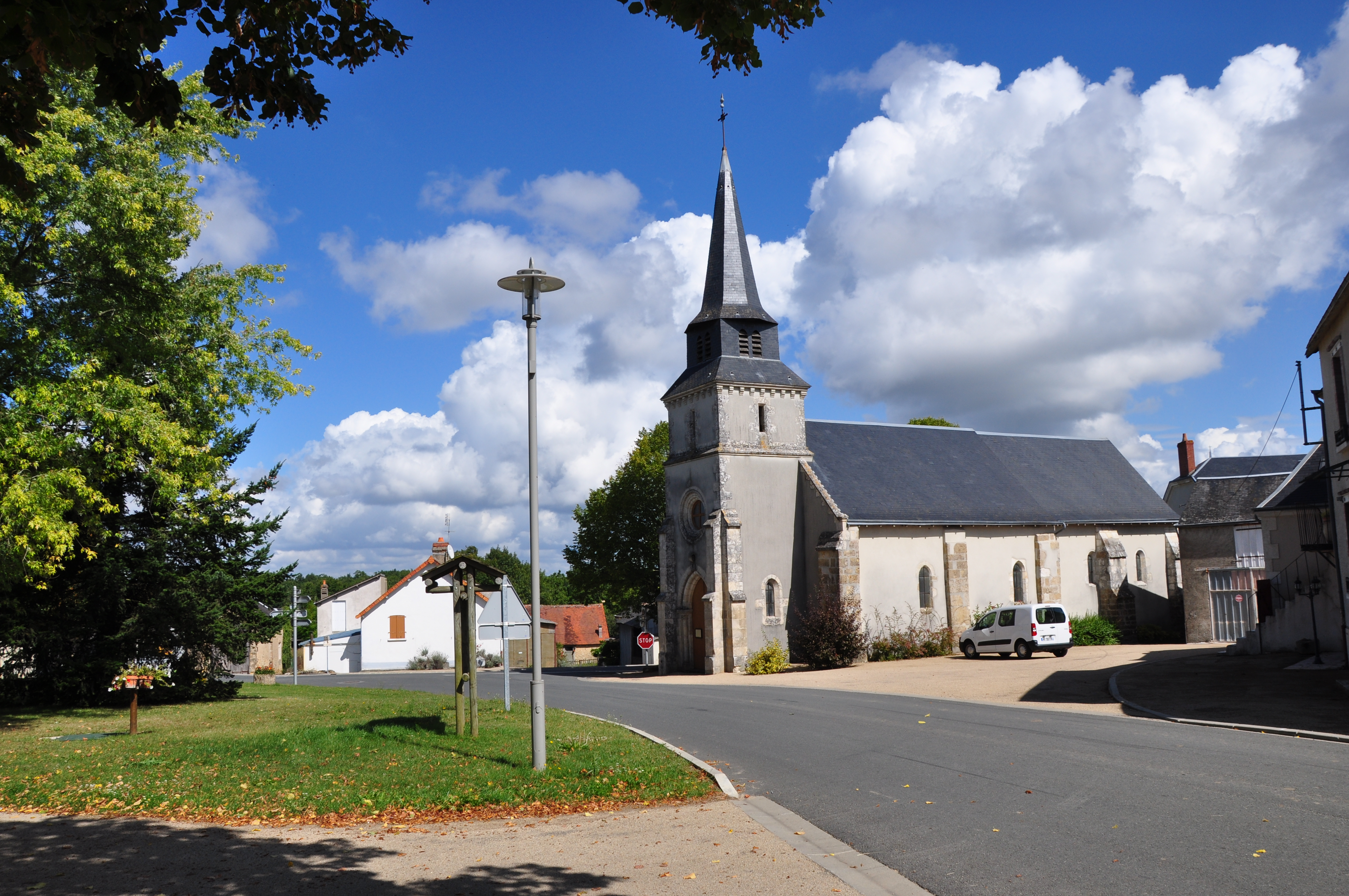
- The church in Malicornay
- Location of Malicornay
- Location within France Location within Centre-Val de Loire
- Coordinates: 46°34′35″N 1°38′52″E
- Country: France
- Region: Centre-Val de Loire
- Department: Indre
- Arrondissement: La Châtre
- Canton: Neuvy-Saint-Sépulchre

Government
  - Mayor (2020–2026): Jean-Paul Ballereau
- Area^{1}: 16.31 km^{2} (6.30 sq mi)
- Elevation: 225 m (738 ft)
- Highest elevation: 281 m (922 ft)
- Lowest elevation: 190 m (620 ft)
- Population (2023): 187
  - Density: 11.5/km^{2} (29.7/sq mi)
- Time zone: UTC+01:00 (CET)
  - Summer (DST): UTC+02:00 (CEST)
- INSEE/Postal code: 36111 /36340
- ^{1} French Land Register data, which excludes lakes, ponds, glaciers > 1 km^{2} (0.386 sq mi or 247 acres) and river estuaries.

Malicornay (French pronunciation: [malikɔʁnɛ]) is a commune in the Indre department in central France.

== Population ==
Historical population
Year	Pop.	±% p.a.
1968	265	—
1975	266	+0.05%
1982	238	−1.58%
1990	194	−2.52%
1999	196	+0.11%
2007	187	−0.59%
2012	190	+0.32%
2017	195	+0.52%
2023	187	−0.70%
Source: INSEE

== Economy ==
As of 2020, the working age population (15–64 years) was 114 people, of which 73% were active (5% unemployed) and 27% were inactive (16% retired, 2% students).

== See also ==
- Communes of the Indre department
