= Verneuil-sur-Igneraie =

- Commune
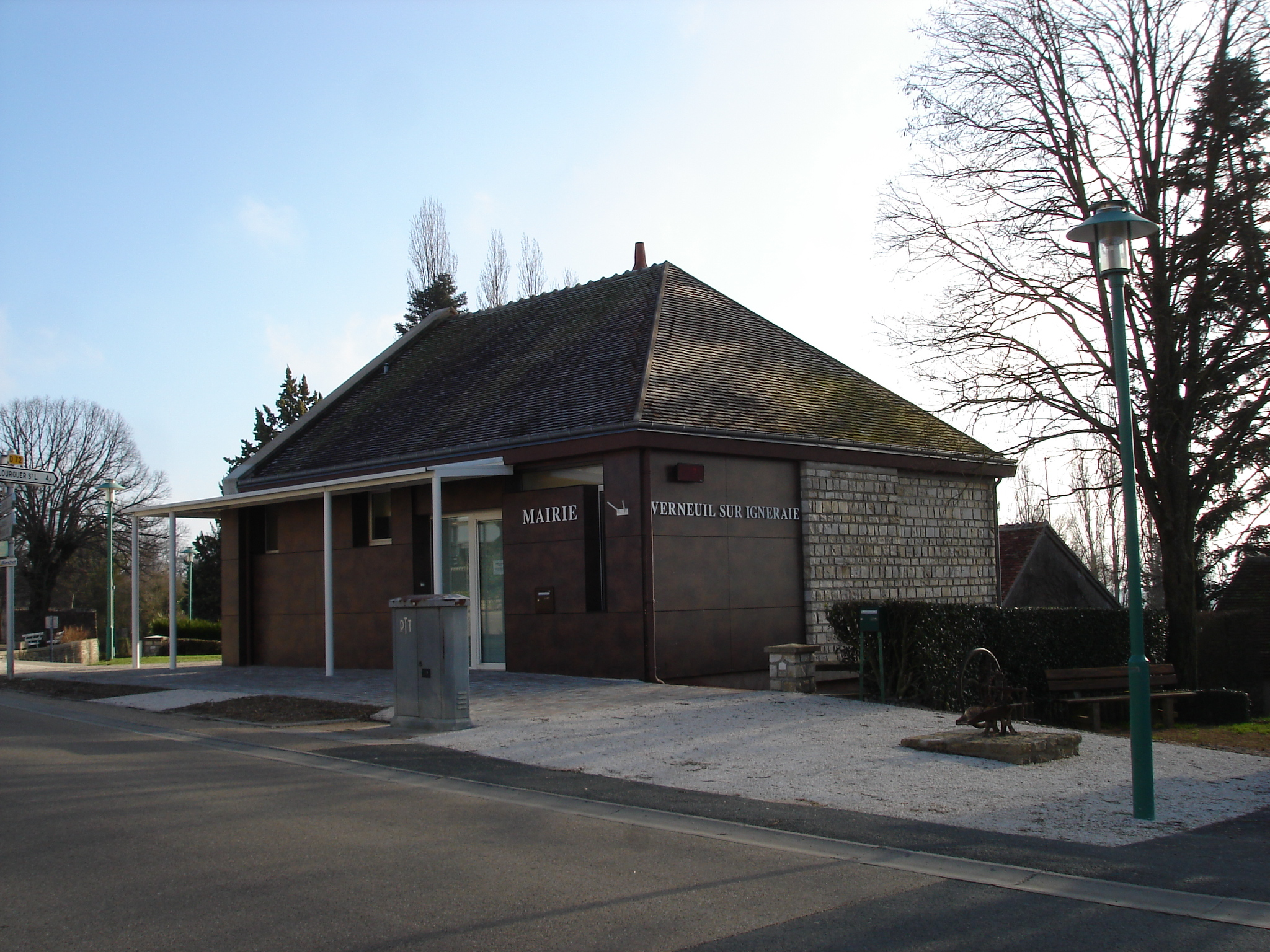
- The town hall in Verneuil-sur-Igneraie
- Location of Verneuil-sur-Igneraie
- Location within France Location within Centre-Val de Loire
- Coordinates: 46°39′21″N 2°00′41″E
- Country: France
- Region: Centre-Val de Loire
- Department: Indre
- Arrondissement: La Châtre
- Canton: La Châtre

Government
  - Mayor (2020–2026): Nicole D'Hooghe
- Area^{1}: 9.84 km^{2} (3.80 sq mi)
- Elevation: 242 m (794 ft)
- Highest elevation: 259 m (850 ft)
- Lowest elevation: 182 m (597 ft)
- Population (2023): 344
  - Density: 35.0/km^{2} (90.5/sq mi)
- Time zone: UTC+01:00 (CET)
  - Summer (DST): UTC+02:00 (CEST)
- INSEE/Postal code: 36234 /36400
- ^{1} French Land Register data, which excludes lakes, ponds, glaciers > 1 km^{2} (0.386 sq mi or 247 acres) and river estuaries.

Verneuil-sur-Igneraie (French pronunciation: [vɛʁnœj syʁ iɲʁɛ]) is a commune in the Indre department in central France.

== Population ==
Historical population
Year	Pop.	±% p.a.
1968	448	—
1975	384	−2.18%
1982	288	−4.03%
1990	316	+1.17%
1999	327	+0.38%
2007	346	+0.71%
2012	340	−0.35%
2017	309	−1.89%
2023	344	+1.80%
Source: INSEE

== See also ==
- Communes of the Indre department
