= Pérassay =

- Commune
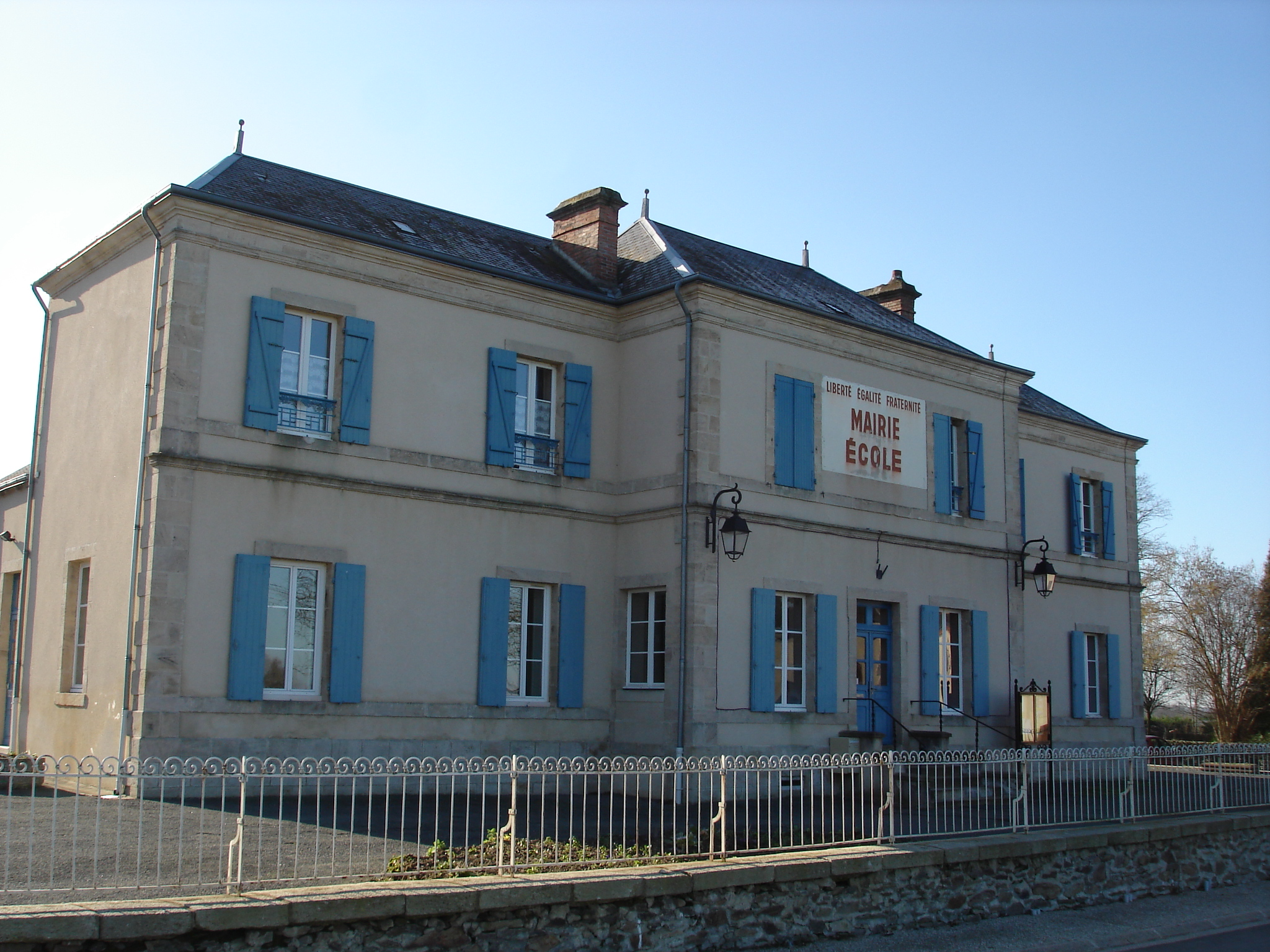
- The town hall in Pérassay
- Location of Pérassay
- Location within France Location within Centre-Val de Loire
- Coordinates: 46°28′21″N 2°08′54″E
- Country: France
- Region: Centre-Val de Loire
- Department: Indre
- Arrondissement: La Châtre
- Canton: La Châtre

Government
  - Mayor (2020–2026): Jean-Luc Doradoux
- Area^{1}: 24.19 km^{2} (9.34 sq mi)
- Elevation: 389 m (1,276 ft)
- Highest elevation: 422 m (1,385 ft)
- Lowest elevation: 268 m (879 ft)
- Population (2023): 416
  - Density: 17.2/km^{2} (44.5/sq mi)
- Time zone: UTC+01:00 (CET)
  - Summer (DST): UTC+02:00 (CEST)
- INSEE/Postal code: 36156 /36160
- ^{1} French Land Register data, which excludes lakes, ponds, glaciers > 1 km^{2} (0.386 sq mi or 247 acres) and river estuaries.

Pérassay (French pronunciation: [peʁasɛ]) is a commune in the Indre department in central France.

== Population ==
Historical population
Year	Pop.	±% p.a.
1968	650	—
1975	535	−2.74%
1982	501	−0.93%
1990	449	−1.36%
1999	443	−0.15%
2007	397	−1.36%
2012	380	−0.87%
2017	362	−0.97%
2023	416	+2.34%
Source: INSEE

== See also ==
- Communes of the Indre department
