= Urciers =

- Commune
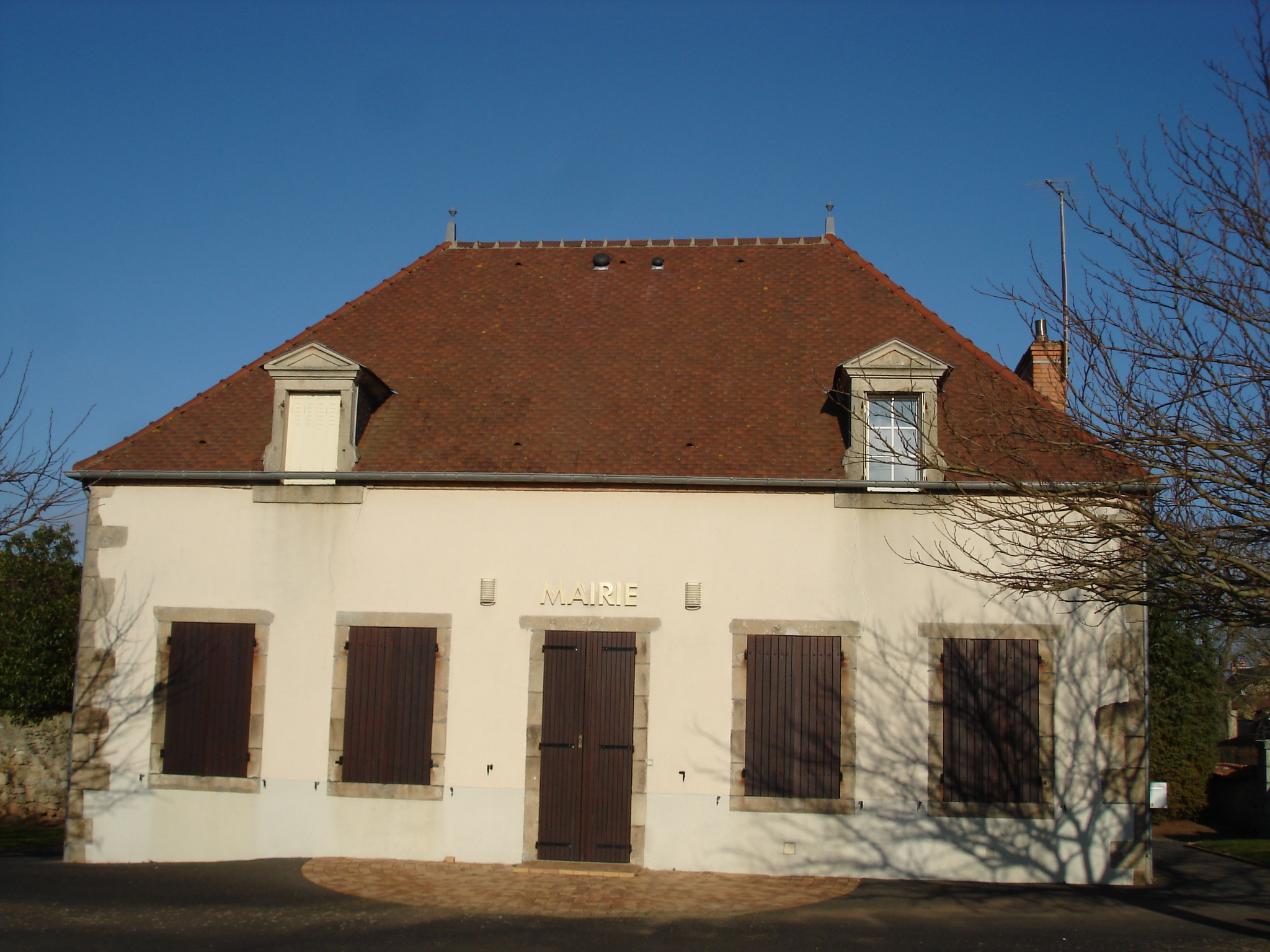
- The town hall in Urciers
- Location of Urciers
- Location within France Location within Centre-Val de Loire
- Coordinates: 46°32′10″N 2°07′54″E
- Country: France
- Region: Centre-Val de Loire
- Department: Indre
- Arrondissement: La Châtre
- Canton: La Châtre

Government
  - Mayor (2020–2026): Alain Guillemain
- Area^{1}: 19.02 km^{2} (7.34 sq mi)
- Elevation: 280 m (920 ft)
- Highest elevation: 363 m (1,191 ft)
- Lowest elevation: 247 m (810 ft)
- Population (2023): 236
  - Density: 12.4/km^{2} (32.1/sq mi)
- Time zone: UTC+01:00 (CET)
  - Summer (DST): UTC+02:00 (CEST)
- INSEE/Postal code: 36227 /36160
- ^{1} French Land Register data, which excludes lakes, ponds, glaciers > 1 km^{2} (0.386 sq mi or 247 acres) and river estuaries.

Urciers (French pronunciation: [yʁsje]) is a commune in the Indre department in central France.

== Population ==
Historical population
Year	Pop.	±% p.a.
1968	448	—
1975	389	−2.00%
1982	332	−2.24%
1990	266	−2.73%
1999	261	−0.21%
2007	268	+0.33%
2012	238	−2.35%
2017	250	+0.99%
2023	236	−0.96%
Source: INSEE

== See also ==
- Communes of the Indre department
