= Thevet-Saint-Julien =

- Commune
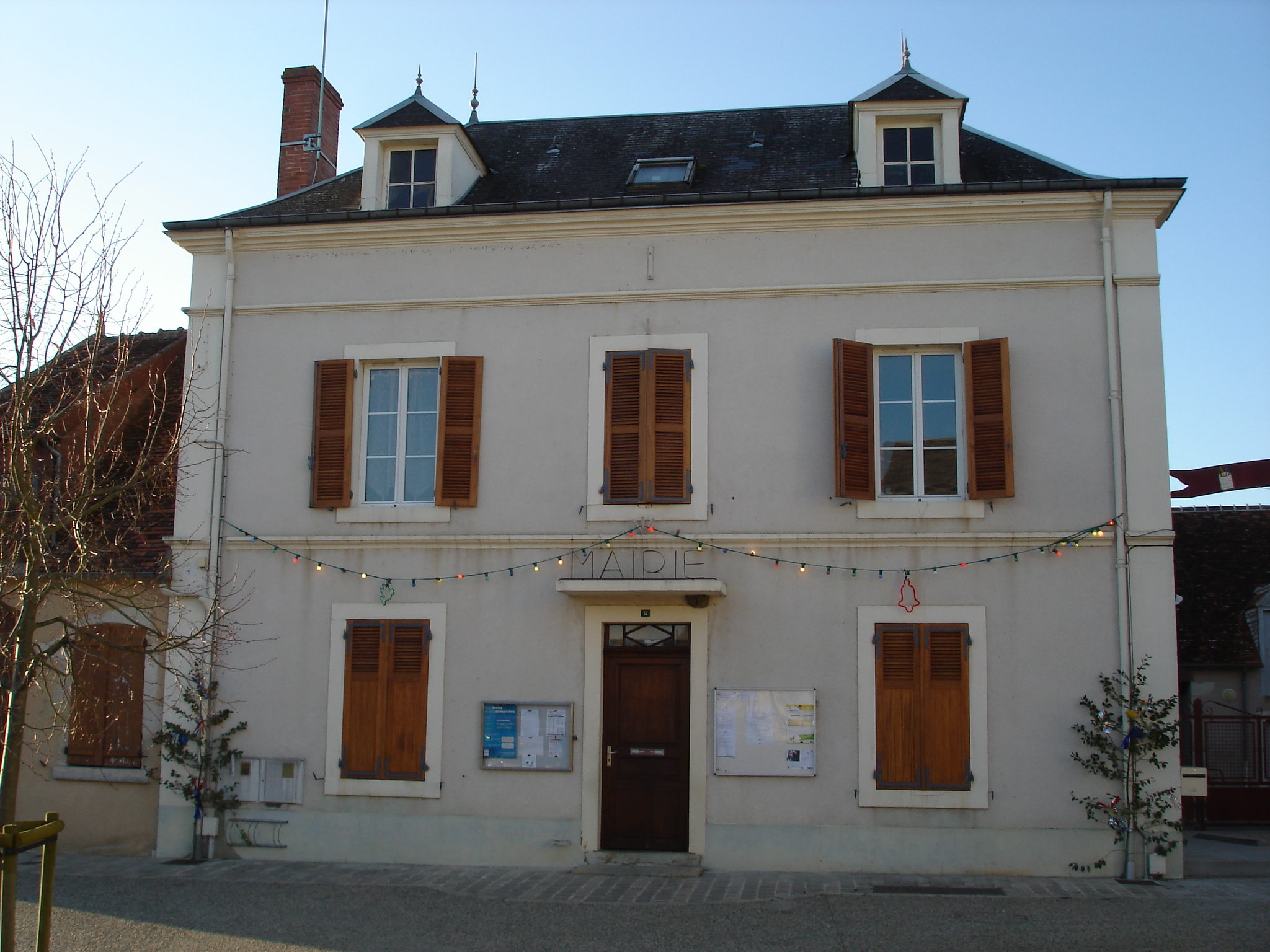
- The town hall in Thevet-Saint-Julien
- Location of Thevet-Saint-Julien
- Location within France Location within Centre-Val de Loire
- Coordinates: 46°38′17″N 2°04′11″E
- Country: France
- Region: Centre-Val de Loire
- Department: Indre
- Arrondissement: La Châtre
- Canton: La Châtre

Government
  - Mayor (2020–2026): Antoine Michot
- Area^{1}: 30.94 km^{2} (11.95 sq mi)
- Elevation: 213 m (699 ft)
- Highest elevation: 263 m (863 ft)
- Lowest elevation: 187 m (614 ft)
- Population (2023): 396
  - Density: 12.8/km^{2} (33.1/sq mi)
- Time zone: UTC+01:00 (CET)
  - Summer (DST): UTC+02:00 (CEST)
- INSEE/Postal code: 36221 /36400
- ^{1} French Land Register data, which excludes lakes, ponds, glaciers > 1 km^{2} (0.386 sq mi or 247 acres) and river estuaries.

Thevet-Saint-Julien is a commune in the Indre department in central France.

== Population ==
Historical population
Year	Pop.	±% p.a.
1968	637	—
1975	552	−2.03%
1982	468	−2.33%
1990	507	+1.01%
1999	455	−1.20%
2007	482	+0.72%
2012	437	−1.94%
2017	389	−2.30%
2023	396	+0.30%
Source: INSEE

== See also ==
- Communes of the Indre department
