= Saint-Août =

- Commune
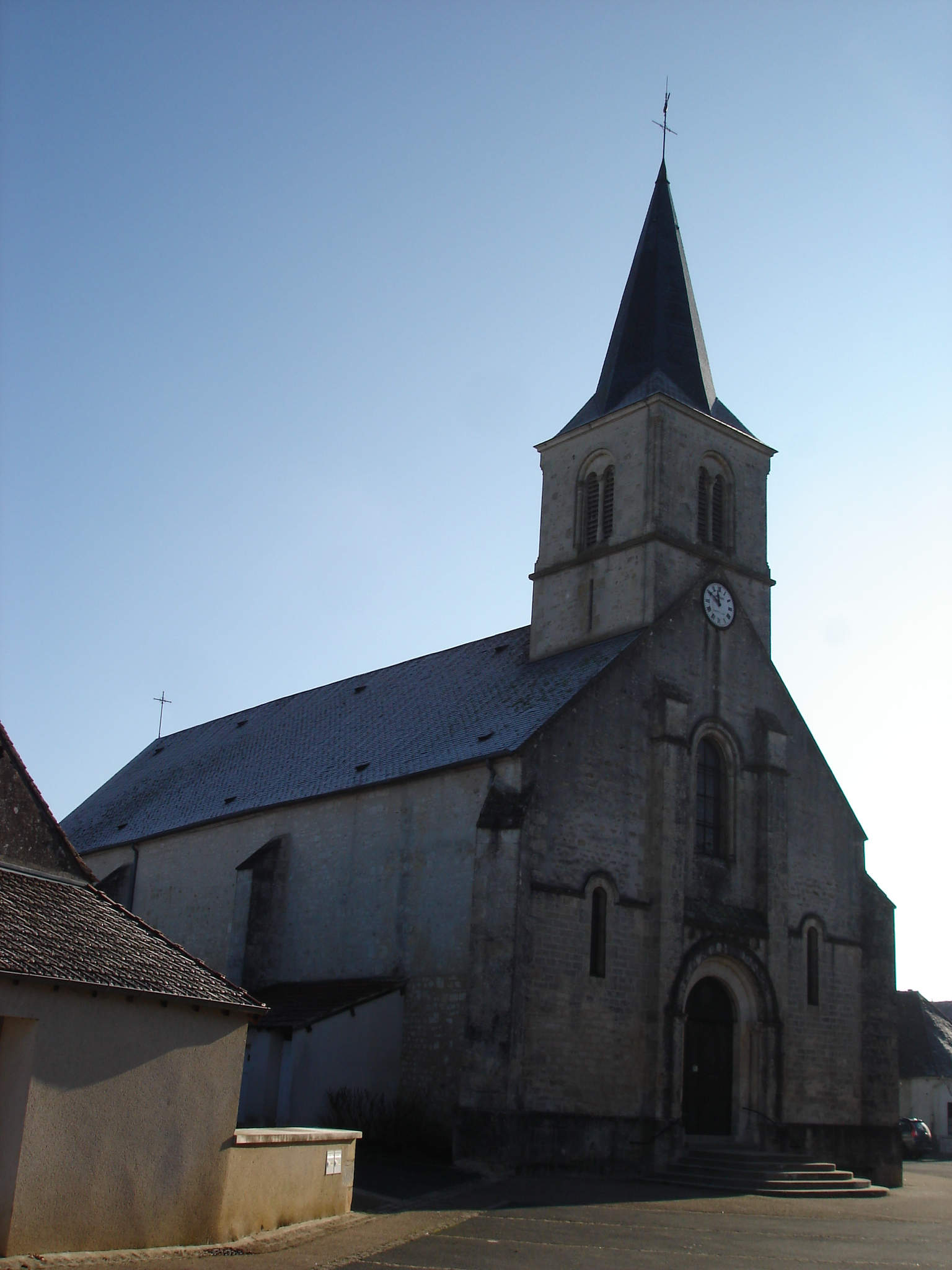
- The church in Saint-Août
- Location of Saint-Août
- Location within France Location within Centre-Val de Loire
- Coordinates: 46°43′56″N 1°57′59″E
- Country: France
- Region: Centre-Val de Loire
- Department: Indre
- Arrondissement: La Châtre
- Canton: La Châtre
- Intercommunality: La Châtre et Sainte-Sévère

Government
  - Mayor (2022–2026): Jean-Pierre Nicolet
- Area^{1}: 54.11 km^{2} (20.89 sq mi)
- Elevation: 200 m (660 ft)
- Highest elevation: 261 m (856 ft)
- Lowest elevation: 162 m (531 ft)
- Population (2023): 811
  - Density: 15.0/km^{2} (38.8/sq mi)
- Time zone: UTC+01:00 (CET)
  - Summer (DST): UTC+02:00 (CEST)
- INSEE/Postal code: 36180 /36120
- ^{1} French Land Register data, which excludes lakes, ponds, glaciers > 1 km^{2} (0.386 sq mi or 247 acres) and river estuaries.

Saint-Août is a commune in the Indre department in central France.

== Population ==
Historical population
Year	Pop.	±% p.a.
1968	1,062	—
1975	891	−2.48%
1982	780	−1.88%
1990	786	+0.10%
1999	814	+0.39%
2007	843	+0.44%
2012	871	+0.66%
2017	836	−0.82%
2023	811	−0.50%
Source: INSEE

== See also ==
- Communes of the Indre department
