= La Berthenoux =

- Commune
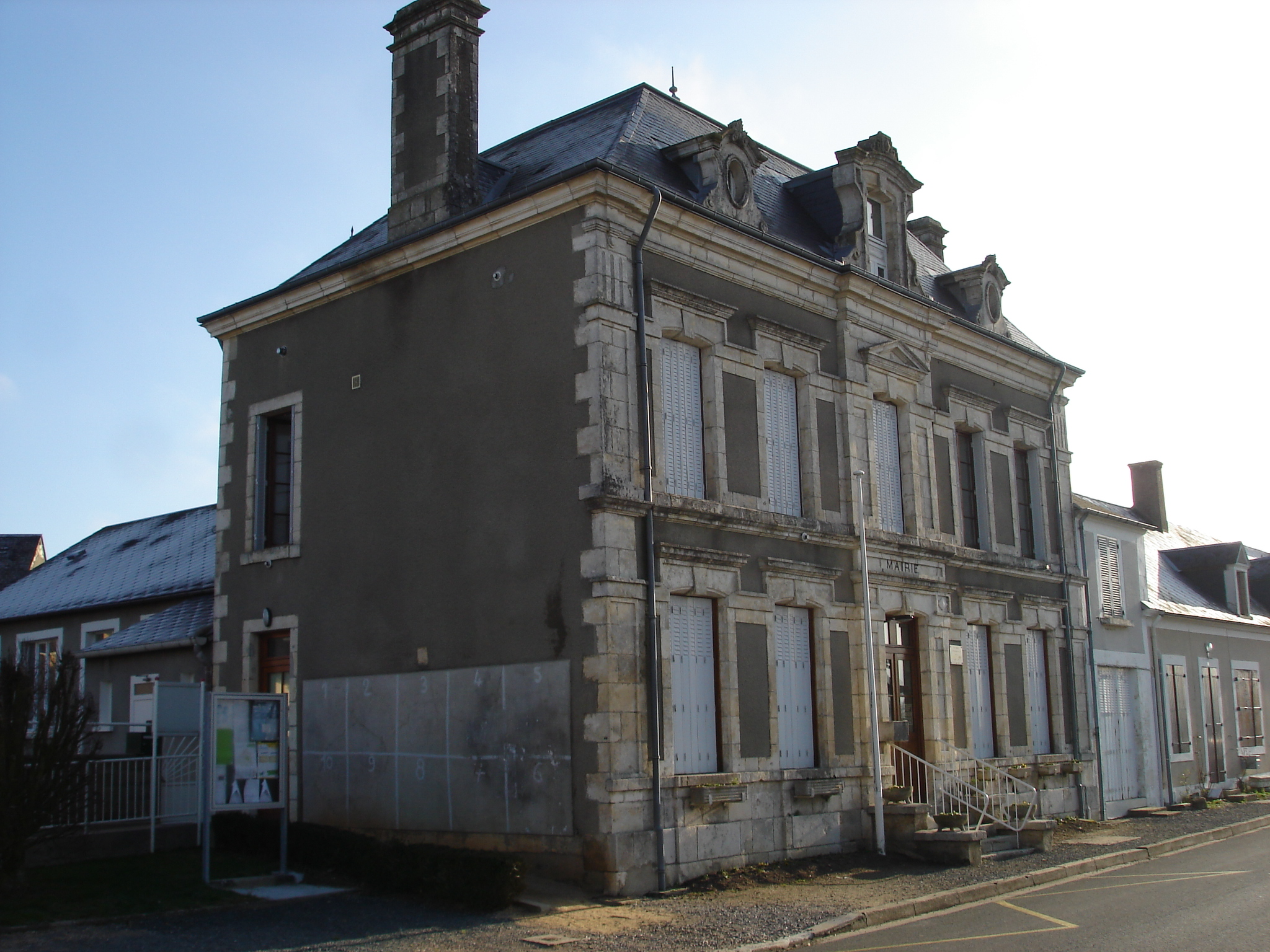
- The town hall in La Berthenoux
- Location of La Berthenoux
- Location within France Location within Centre-Val de Loire
- Coordinates: 46°39′42″N 2°03′46″E
- Country: France
- Region: Centre-Val de Loire
- Department: Indre
- Arrondissement: La Châtre
- Canton: La Châtre
- Intercommunality: La Châtre et Sainte-Sévère

Government
  - Mayor (2020–2026): Philippe Patrigeon
- Area^{1}: 39.82 km^{2} (15.37 sq mi)
- Elevation: 246 m (807 ft)
- Highest elevation: 269 m (883 ft)
- Lowest elevation: 184 m (604 ft)
- Population (2023): 361
  - Density: 9.07/km^{2} (23.5/sq mi)
- Time zone: UTC+01:00 (CET)
  - Summer (DST): UTC+02:00 (CEST)
- INSEE/Postal code: 36017 /36400
- ^{1} French Land Register data, which excludes lakes, ponds, glaciers > 1 km^{2} (0.386 sq mi or 247 acres) and river estuaries.

La Berthenoux (French pronunciation: [la bɛʁtənu]) is a commune in the Indre department in central France.

== Population ==
Historical population
Year	Pop.	±% p.a.
1968	743	—
1975	622	−2.51%
1982	539	−2.03%
1990	467	−1.78%
1999	468	+0.02%
2007	471	+0.08%
2012	441	−1.31%
2017	397	−2.08%
2023	361	−1.57%
Source: INSEE

== See also ==
- Communes of the Indre department
