= Pouligny-Saint-Martin =

- Commune
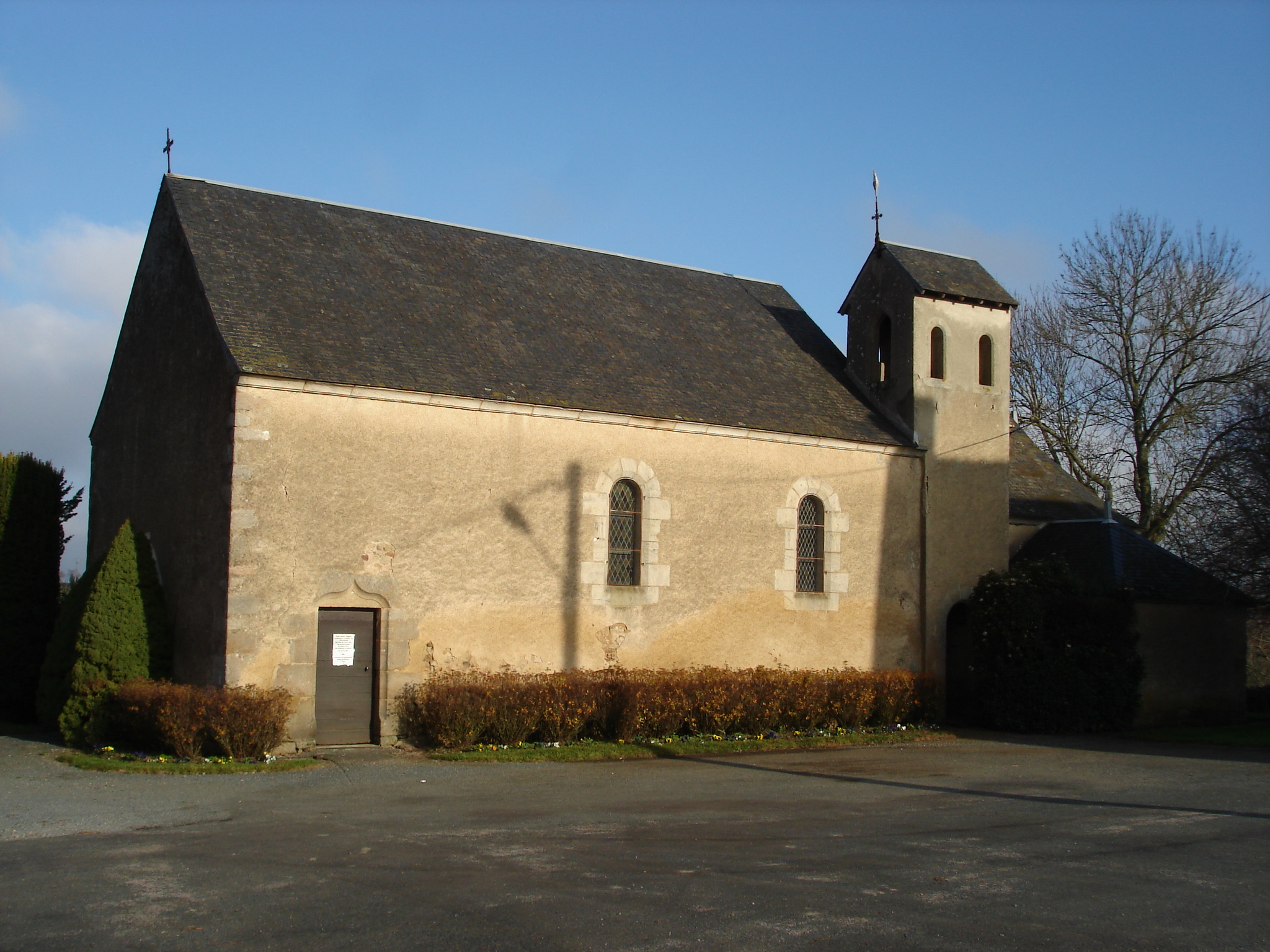
- The church in Pouligny-Saint-Martin
- Location of Pouligny-Saint-Martin
- Location within France Location within Centre-Val de Loire
- Coordinates: 46°31′02″N 2°00′57″E
- Country: France
- Region: Centre-Val de Loire
- Department: Indre
- Arrondissement: La Châtre
- Canton: La Châtre

Government
  - Mayor (2020–2026): Eric Weinling
- Area^{1}: 15.66 km^{2} (6.05 sq mi)
- Elevation: 290 m (950 ft)
- Highest elevation: 342 m (1,122 ft)
- Lowest elevation: 225 m (738 ft)
- Population (2023): 235
  - Density: 15.0/km^{2} (38.9/sq mi)
- Time zone: UTC+01:00 (CET)
  - Summer (DST): UTC+02:00 (CEST)
- INSEE/Postal code: 36164 /36160
- ^{1} French Land Register data, which excludes lakes, ponds, glaciers > 1 km^{2} (0.386 sq mi or 247 acres) and river estuaries.

Pouligny-Saint-Martin (French pronunciation: [puliɲi sɛ̃ maʁtɛ̃]) is a commune in the Indre department in central France.

== Population ==
Historical population
Year	Pop.	±% p.a.
1968	328	—
1975	270	−2.74%
1982	240	−1.67%
1990	238	−0.10%
1999	254	+0.73%
2007	248	−0.30%
2012	230	−1.50%
2017	222	−0.71%
2023	235	+0.95%
Source: INSEE

== See also ==
- Communes of the Indre department
