= Vijon =

- Commune
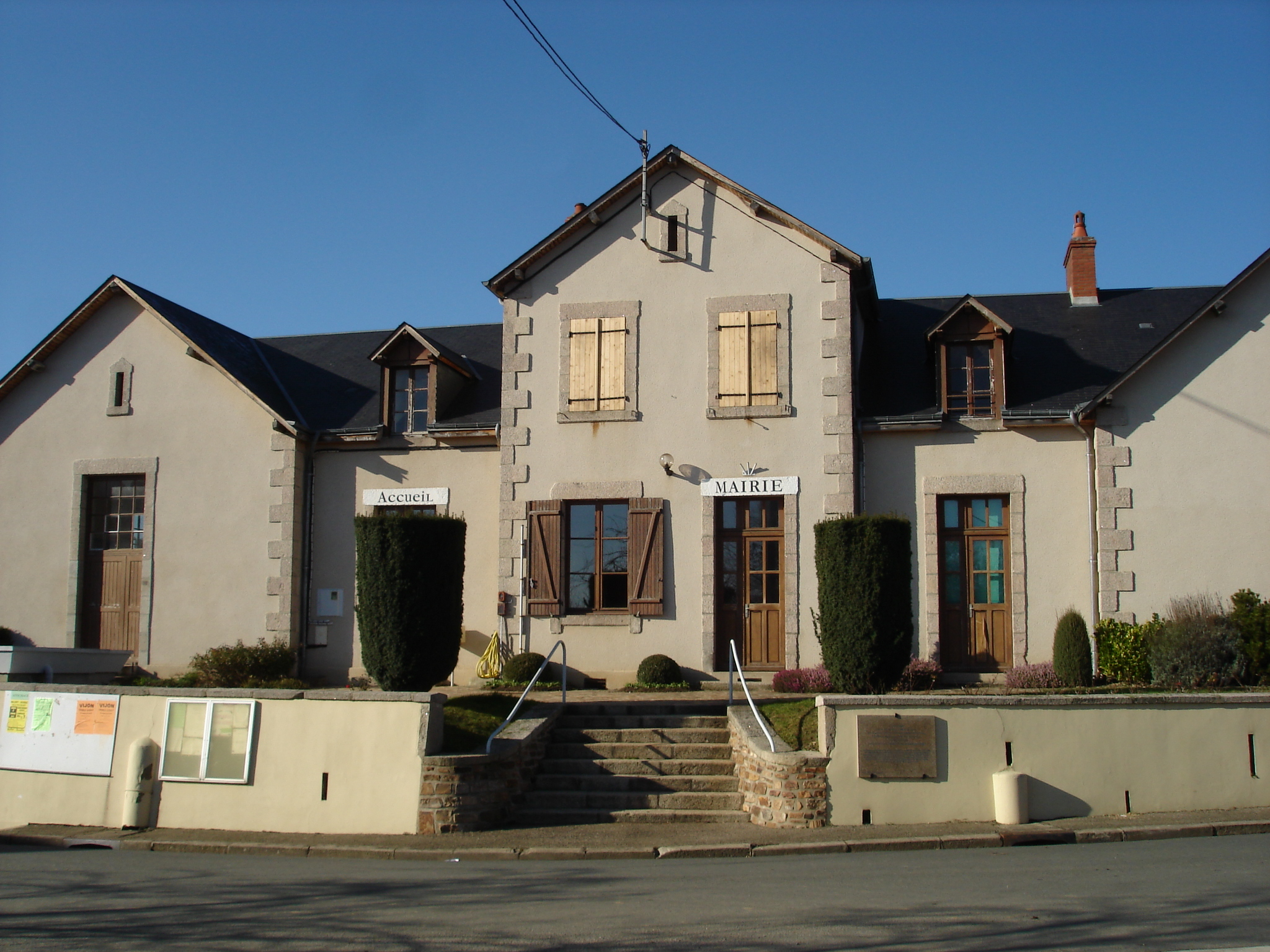
- The town hall in Vijon
- Location of Vijon
- Location within France Location within Centre-Val de Loire
- Coordinates: 46°25′49″N 2°07′11″E
- Country: France
- Region: Centre-Val de Loire
- Department: Indre
- Arrondissement: La Châtre
- Canton: La Châtre

Government
  - Mayor (2020–2026): Benoît Rabret
- Area^{1}: 21.26 km^{2} (8.21 sq mi)
- Elevation: 454 m (1,490 ft)
- Highest elevation: 454 m (1,490 ft)
- Lowest elevation: 299 m (981 ft)
- Population (2023): 300
  - Density: 14/km^{2} (37/sq mi)
- Time zone: UTC+01:00 (CET)
  - Summer (DST): UTC+02:00 (CEST)
- INSEE/Postal code: 36240 /36160
- ^{1} French Land Register data, which excludes lakes, ponds, glaciers > 1 km^{2} (0.386 sq mi or 247 acres) and river estuaries.

Vijon (French pronunciation: [viʒɔ̃]) is a commune in the Indre department in central France.

== Population ==
Historical population
Year	Pop.	±% p.a.
1968	571	—
1975	486	−2.28%
1982	369	−3.86%
1990	339	−1.05%
1999	320	−0.64%
2007	312	−0.32%
2012	308	−0.26%
2017	303	−0.33%
2023	300	−0.17%
Source: INSEE

== See also ==
- Communes of the Indre department
