= Pruniers =

- Commune
- Location of Pruniers
- Location within France Location within Centre-Val de Loire
- Coordinates: 46°47′22″N 2°03′08″E
- Country: France
- Region: Centre-Val de Loire
- Department: Indre
- Arrondissement: Issoudun
- Canton: La Châtre

Government
  - Mayor (2020–2026): Serge Bouquin
- Area^{1}: 49 km^{2} (19 sq mi)
- Elevation: 167 m (548 ft)
- Highest elevation: 200 m (660 ft)
- Lowest elevation: 151 m (495 ft)
- Population (2023): 496
  - Density: 10/km^{2} (26/sq mi)
- Time zone: UTC+01:00 (CET)
  - Summer (DST): UTC+02:00 (CEST)
- INSEE/Postal code: 36169 /36120
- ^{1} French Land Register data, which excludes lakes, ponds, glaciers > 1 km^{2} (0.386 sq mi or 247 acres) and river estuaries.

Pruniers (French pronunciation: [pʁynje]) is a commune in the Indre department in central France.

== Population ==
Historical population
Year	Pop.	±% p.a.
1968	638	—
1975	551	−2.07%
1982	533	−0.47%
1990	449	−2.12%
1999	416	−0.84%
2007	519	+2.80%
2012	558	+1.46%
2017	515	−1.59%
2023	496	−0.62%
Source: INSEE

== See also ==
- Communes of the Indre department
