= Lacs, Indre =

Lacs
- Commune
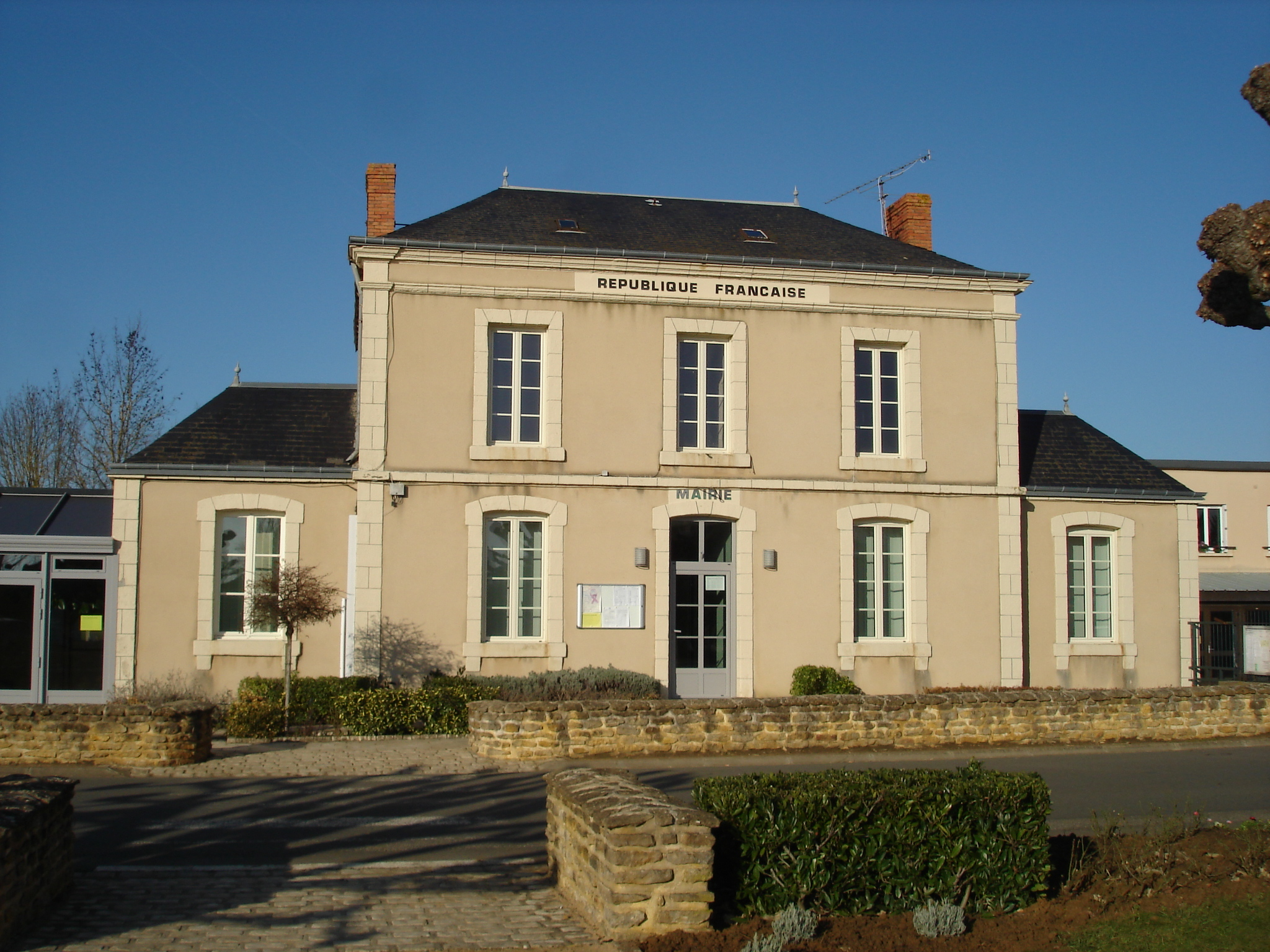
- The town hall in Lacs
- Location of Lacs
- Location within France Location within Centre-Val de Loire
- Coordinates: 46°35′10″N 2°01′29″E
- Country: France
- Region: Centre-Val de Loire
- Department: Indre
- Arrondissement: La Châtre
- Canton: La Châtre

Government
  - Mayor (2020–2026): Philippe Aubrun-Sassier
- Area^{1}: 13.46 km^{2} (5.20 sq mi)
- Elevation: 220 m (720 ft)
- Highest elevation: 263 m (863 ft)
- Lowest elevation: 203 m (666 ft)
- Population (2023): 653
  - Density: 48.5/km^{2} (126/sq mi)
- Time zone: UTC+01:00 (CET)
  - Summer (DST): UTC+02:00 (CEST)
- INSEE/Postal code: 36091 /36400
- ^{1} French Land Register data, which excludes lakes, ponds, glaciers > 1 km^{2} (0.386 sq mi or 247 acres) and river estuaries.

Lacs (French pronunciation: [lak]) is a commune in the Indre department in central France.

== Population ==
Historical population
Year	Pop.	±% p.a.
1968	301	—
1975	298	−0.14%
1982	506	+7.86%
1990	603	+2.22%
1999	614	+0.20%
2007	655	+0.81%
2012	642	−0.40%
2017	653	+0.34%
2023	653	+0.00%
Source: INSEE

== See also ==
- Communes of the Indre department
