= Vicq-Exemplet =

- Commune
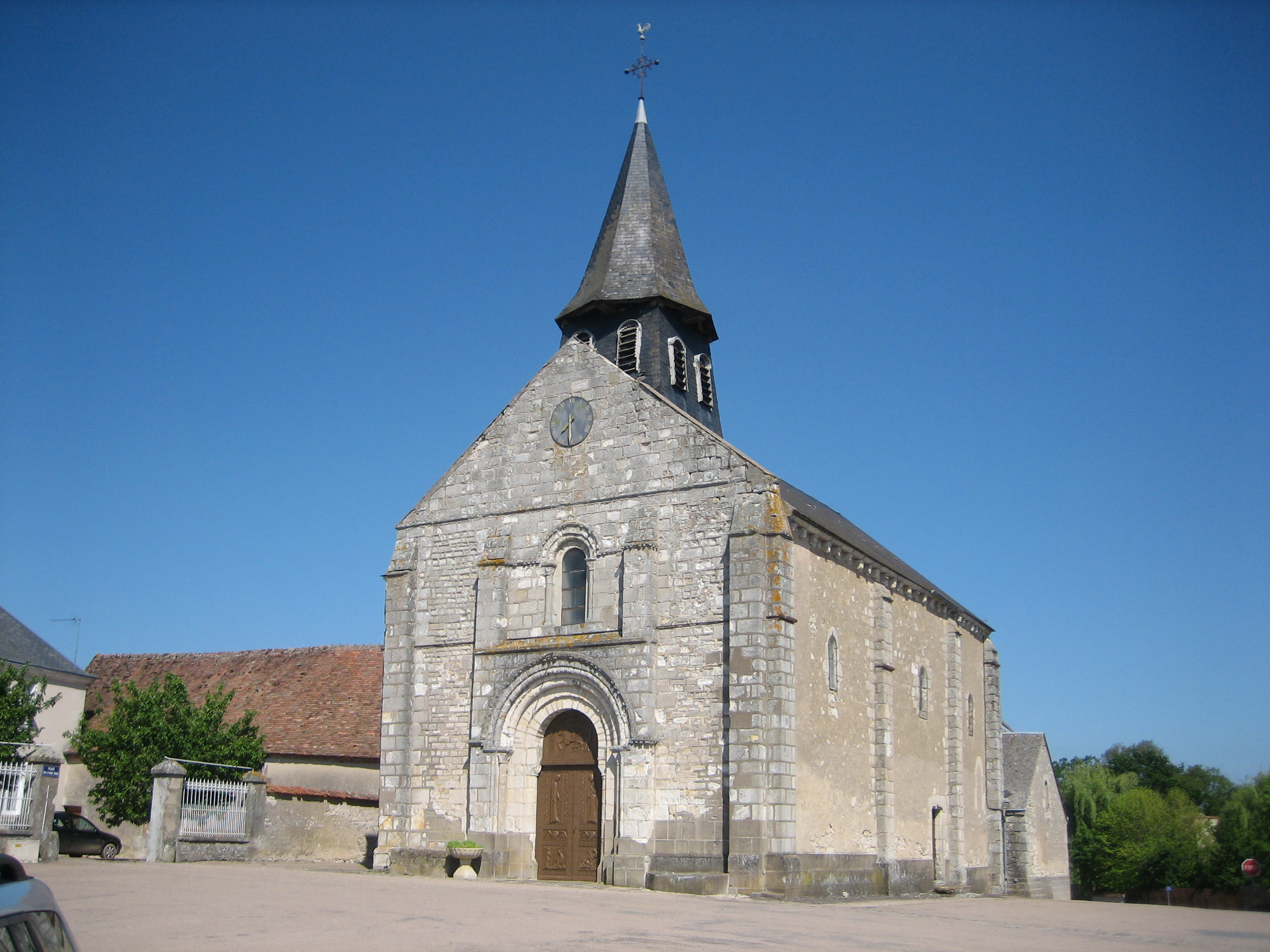
- The church of Saint-Martin, in Vicq-Exemplet
- Location of Vicq-Exemplet
- Location within France Location within Centre-Val de Loire
- Coordinates: 46°37′47″N 2°08′31″E
- Country: France
- Region: Centre-Val de Loire
- Department: Indre
- Arrondissement: La Châtre
- Canton: La Châtre

Government
  - Mayor (2020–2026): Pascal Couturier
- Area^{1}: 38.74 km^{2} (14.96 sq mi)
- Elevation: 240 m (790 ft)
- Highest elevation: 263 m (863 ft)
- Lowest elevation: 185 m (607 ft)
- Population (2023): 330
  - Density: 8.5/km^{2} (22/sq mi)
- Time zone: UTC+01:00 (CET)
  - Summer (DST): UTC+02:00 (CEST)
- INSEE/Postal code: 36236 /36400
- ^{1} French Land Register data, which excludes lakes, ponds, glaciers > 1 km^{2} (0.386 sq mi or 247 acres) and river estuaries.

Vicq-Exemplet (French pronunciation: [vik ɛɡzɑ̃plɛ]) is a commune in the Indre department in central France.

== Population ==
Historical population
Year	Pop.	±% p.a.
1968	566	—
1975	484	−2.21%
1982	424	−1.87%
1990	369	−1.72%
1999	360	−0.27%
2007	334	−0.93%
2012	324	−0.61%
2017	319	−0.31%
2023	330	+0.57%
Source: INSEE

== See also ==
- Communes of the Indre department
