= Lourouer-Saint-Laurent =

- Commune
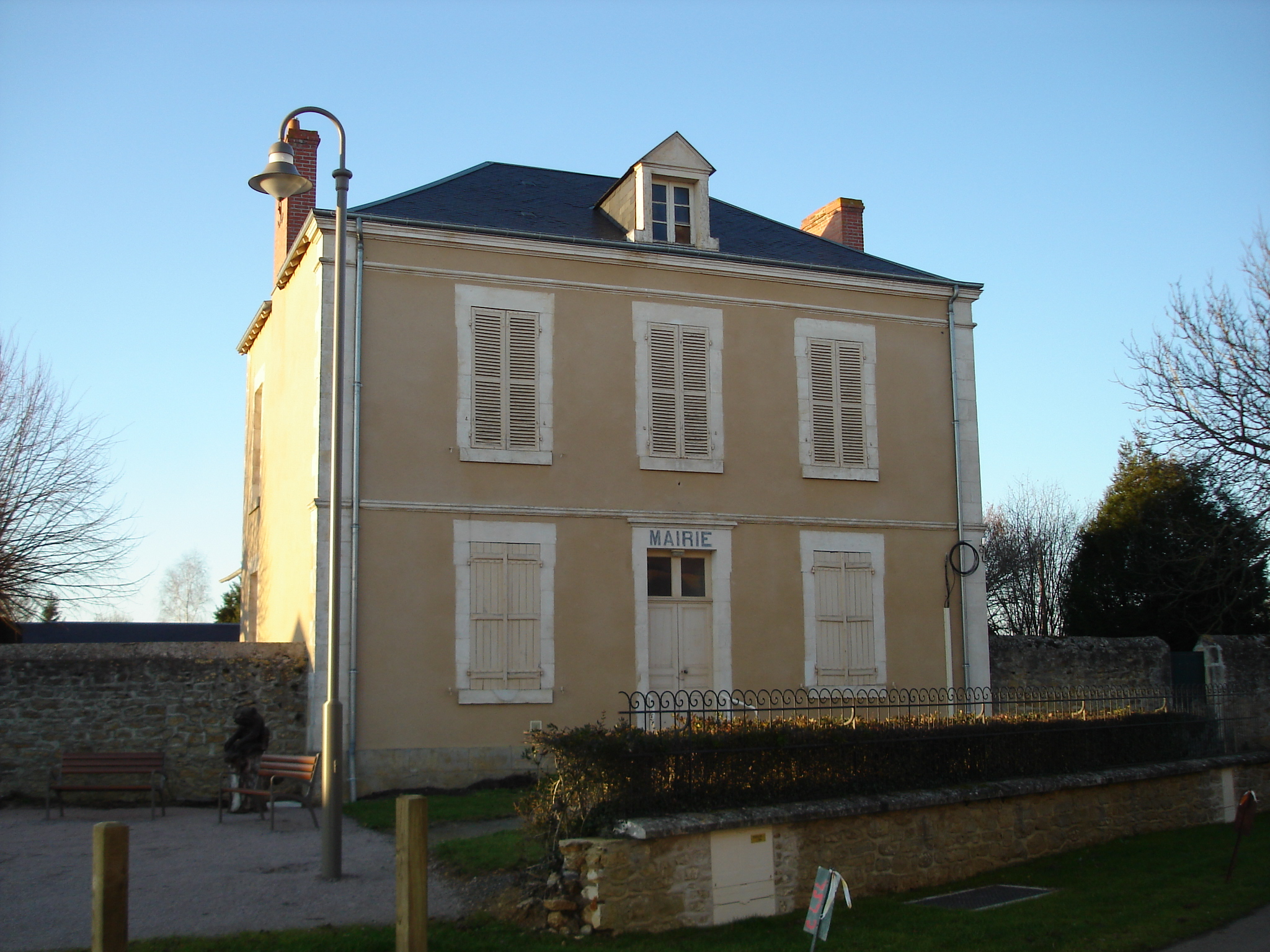
- The old town hall in Lourouer-Saint-Laurent
- Location of Lourouer-Saint-Laurent
- Location within France Location within Centre-Val de Loire
- Coordinates: 46°37′27″N 2°00′49″E
- Country: France
- Region: Centre-Val de Loire
- Department: Indre
- Arrondissement: La Châtre
- Canton: La Châtre

Government
  - Mayor (2020–2026): Pascal Chéramy
- Area^{1}: 11.21 km^{2} (4.33 sq mi)
- Elevation: 217 m (712 ft)
- Highest elevation: 246 m (807 ft)
- Lowest elevation: 194 m (636 ft)
- Population (2023): 245
  - Density: 21.9/km^{2} (56.6/sq mi)
- Time zone: UTC+01:00 (CET)
  - Summer (DST): UTC+02:00 (CEST)
- INSEE/Postal code: 36100 /36400
- ^{1} French Land Register data, which excludes lakes, ponds, glaciers > 1 km^{2} (0.386 sq mi or 247 acres) and river estuaries.

Lourouer-Saint-Laurent is a town and commune in the Indre department in central France.

== Population ==
Historical population
Year	Pop.	±% p.a.
1968	246	—
1975	228	−1.08%
1982	231	+0.19%
1990	228	−0.16%
1999	224	−0.20%
2007	226	+0.11%
2012	259	+2.76%
2017	270	+0.84%
2023	245	−1.61%
Source: INSEE

== See also ==
- Communes of the Indre department
