= La Motte-Feuilly =

- Commune
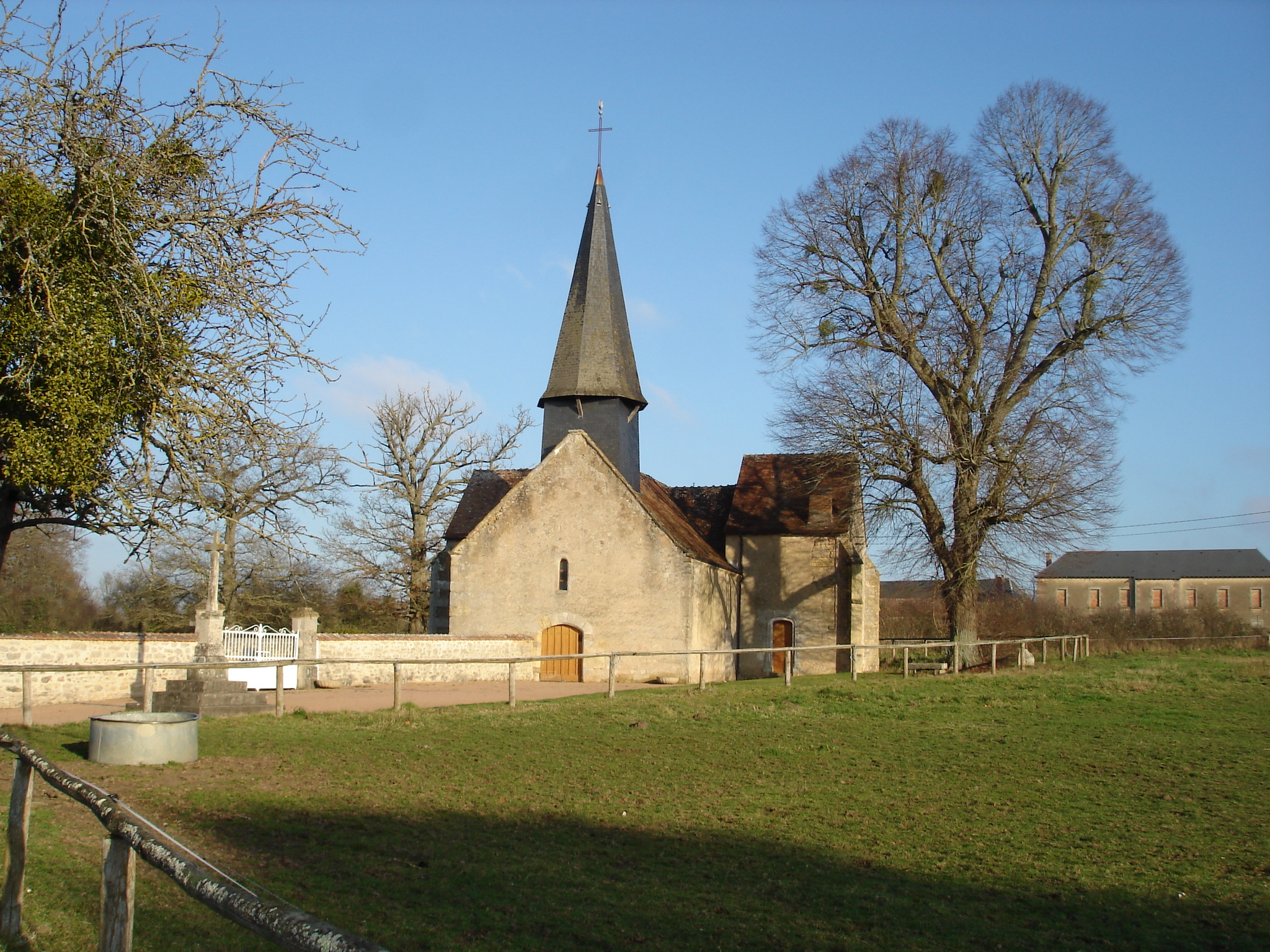
- The church of Saint-Hilaire, in La Motte-Feuilly
- Location of La Motte-Feuilly
- Location within France Location within Centre-Val de Loire
- Coordinates: 46°32′34″N 2°05′27″E
- Country: France
- Region: Centre-Val de Loire
- Department: Indre
- Arrondissement: La Châtre
- Canton: La Châtre

Government
  - Mayor (2020–2026): Maryse Rouillard
- Area^{1}: 5.68 km^{2} (2.19 sq mi)
- Elevation: 244 m (801 ft)
- Highest elevation: 274 m (899 ft)
- Lowest elevation: 228 m (748 ft)
- Population (2023): 67
  - Density: 12/km^{2} (31/sq mi)
- Time zone: UTC+01:00 (CET)
  - Summer (DST): UTC+02:00 (CEST)
- INSEE/Postal code: 36132 /36160
- ^{1} French Land Register data, which excludes lakes, ponds, glaciers > 1 km^{2} (0.386 sq mi or 247 acres) and river estuaries.

La Motte-Feuilly (French pronunciation: [la mɔt fœji]) is a commune in the Indre department in central France.

== Population ==
Historical population
Year	Pop.	±% p.a.
1968	75	—
1975	44	−7.34%
1982	43	−0.33%
1990	44	+0.29%
1999	42	−0.52%
2007	33	−2.97%
2012	40	+3.92%
2017	58	+7.71%
2023	67	+2.43%
Source: INSEE

== See also ==
- Communes of the Indre department
