= Briantes =

- Commune
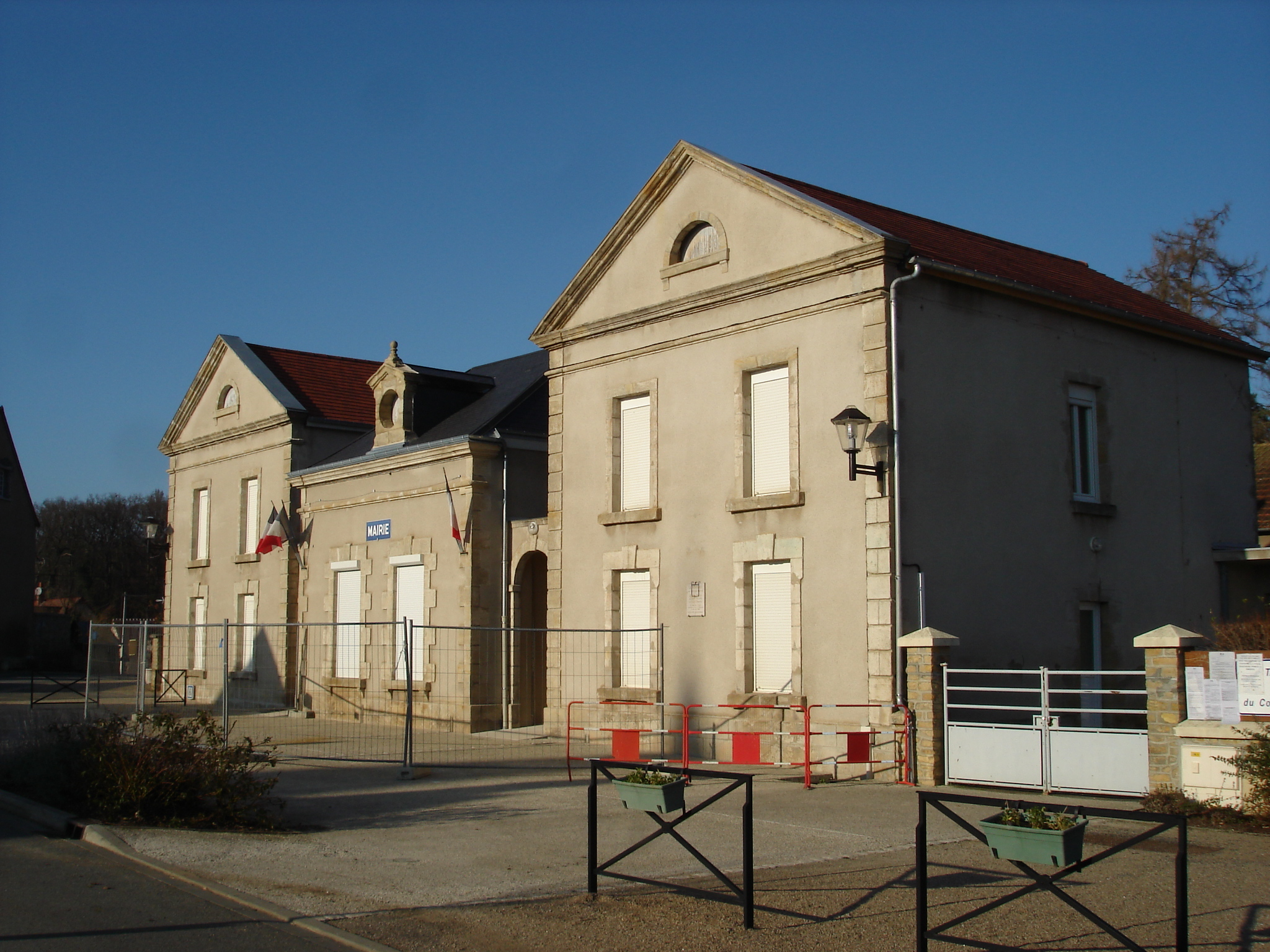
- The town hall in Briantes
- Location of Briantes
- Location within France Location within Centre-Val de Loire
- Coordinates: 46°33′31″N 2°01′24″E
- Country: France
- Region: Centre-Val de Loire
- Department: Indre
- Arrondissement: La Châtre
- Canton: La Châtre
- Intercommunality: La Châtre et Sainte-Sévère

Government
  - Mayor (2020–2026): Jean-Claude Boury
- Area^{1}: 23.12 km^{2} (8.93 sq mi)
- Elevation: 227 m (745 ft)
- Highest elevation: 308 m (1,010 ft)
- Lowest elevation: 207 m (679 ft)
- Population (2023): 589
  - Density: 25.5/km^{2} (66.0/sq mi)
- Time zone: UTC+01:00 (CET)
  - Summer (DST): UTC+02:00 (CEST)
- INSEE/Postal code: 36025 /36400
- ^{1} French Land Register data, which excludes lakes, ponds, glaciers > 1 km^{2} (0.386 sq mi or 247 acres) and river estuaries.

Briantes (French pronunciation: [bʁijɑ̃t]) is a commune in the Indre department in central France.

== Population ==
Historical population
Year	Pop.	±% p.a.
1968	664	—
1975	554	−2.55%
1982	542	−0.31%
1990	526	−0.37%
1999	557	+0.64%
2007	594	+0.81%
2012	608	+0.47%
2017	605	−0.10%
2023	589	−0.45%
Source: INSEE

== See also ==
- Communes of the Indre department
