= Montchevrier =

- Commune
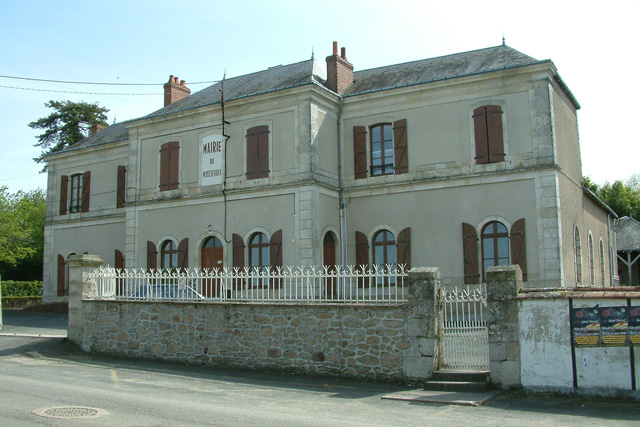
- The town hall in Montchevrier
- Location of Montchevrier
- Location within France Location within Centre-Val de Loire
- Coordinates: 46°28′53″N 1°44′36″E
- Country: France
- Region: Centre-Val de Loire
- Department: Indre
- Arrondissement: La Châtre
- Canton: Neuvy-Saint-Sépulchre
- Intercommunality: Marche berrichonne

Government
  - Mayor (2020–2026): Maurice Desriers
- Area^{1}: 34.7 km^{2} (13.4 sq mi)
- Elevation: 366 m (1,201 ft)
- Highest elevation: 397 m (1,302 ft)
- Lowest elevation: 230 m (750 ft)
- Population (2023): 446
  - Density: 12.9/km^{2} (33.3/sq mi)
- Time zone: UTC+01:00 (CET)
  - Summer (DST): UTC+02:00 (CEST)
- INSEE/Postal code: 36126 /36140
- ^{1} French Land Register data, which excludes lakes, ponds, glaciers > 1 km^{2} (0.386 sq mi or 247 acres) and river estuaries.

Montchevrier (French pronunciation: [mɔ̃ʃəvʁije]) is a commune in the Indre department in central France.

== Geography ==
The commune is traversed by the river Bouzanne.

== Population ==
Historical population
Year	Pop.	±% p.a.
1968	987	—
1975	836	−2.34%
1982	760	−1.35%
1990	631	−2.30%
1999	537	−1.78%
2007	520	−0.40%
2012	484	−1.42%
2017	451	−1.40%
2023	446	−0.19%
Source: INSEE

== See also ==
- Communes of the Indre department
