= Neuvy-Pailloux =

- Commune
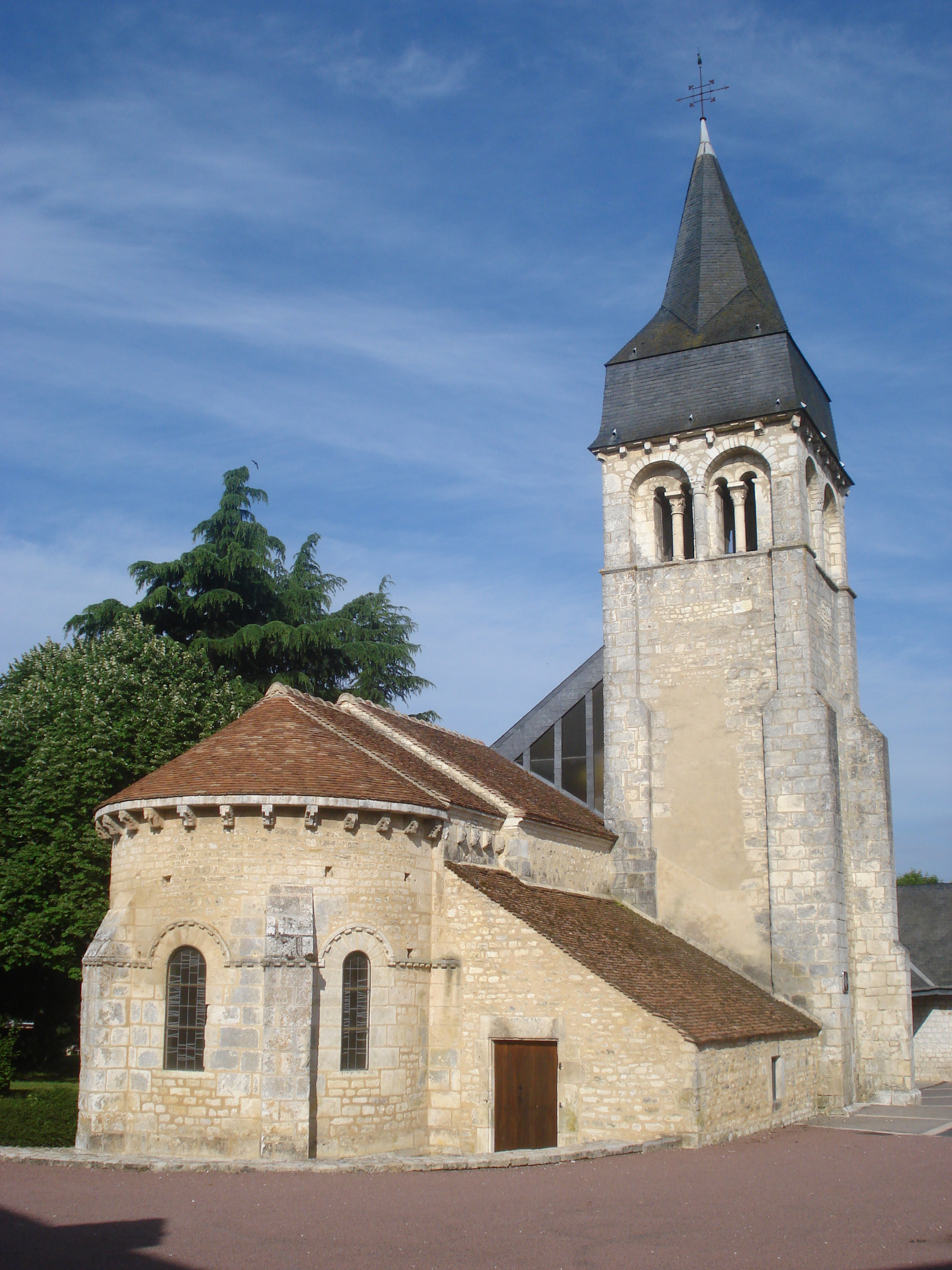
- The Church of Saint-Laurent, in Neuvy-Pailloux

- Coat of arms
- Location of Neuvy-Pailloux
- Location within France Location within Centre-Val de Loire
- Coordinates: 46°53′12″N 1°51′40″E
- Country: France
- Region: Centre-Val de Loire
- Department: Indre
- Arrondissement: Issoudun
- Canton: La Châtre
- Intercommunality: Champagne Boischauts

Government
  - Mayor (2020–2026): Remi Devau
- Area^{1}: 41.81 km^{2} (16.14 sq mi)
- Elevation: 149 m (489 ft)
- Highest elevation: 174 m (571 ft)
- Lowest elevation: 140 m (460 ft)
- Population (2023): 1,159
  - Density: 27.72/km^{2} (71.80/sq mi)
- Time zone: UTC+01:00 (CET)
  - Summer (DST): UTC+02:00 (CEST)
- INSEE/Postal code: 36140 /36100
- ^{1} French Land Register data, which excludes lakes, ponds, glaciers > 1 km^{2} (0.386 sq mi or 247 acres) and river estuaries.

Neuvy-Pailloux (French pronunciation: [nøvi paju]) is a commune in the Indre department in central France.

== Population ==
Historical population
Year	Pop.	±% p.a.
1968	1,185	—
1975	1,261	+0.89%
1982	1,419	+1.70%
1990	1,250	−1.57%
1999	1,158	−0.85%
2007	1,301	+1.47%
2012	1,303	+0.03%
2017	1,196	−1.70%
2023	1,159	−0.52%
Source: INSEE

== See also ==
- Communes of the Indre department
