= Feusines =

- Commune
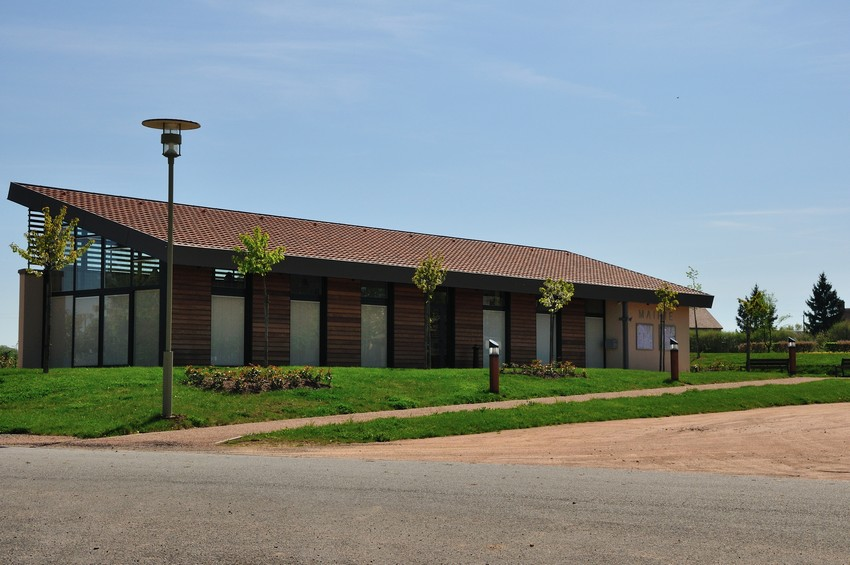
- The town hall in Feusines
- Location of Feusines
- Location within France Location within Centre-Val de Loire
- Coordinates: 46°31′23″N 2°06′10″E
- Country: France
- Region: Centre-Val de Loire
- Department: Indre
- Arrondissement: La Châtre
- Canton: La Châtre
- Intercommunality: La Châtre et Sainte-Sévère

Government
  - Mayor (2020–2026): Patrick Charasson
- Area^{1}: 12.49 km^{2} (4.82 sq mi)
- Elevation: 314 m (1,030 ft)
- Highest elevation: 361 m (1,184 ft)
- Lowest elevation: 253 m (830 ft)
- Population (2023): 205
  - Density: 16.4/km^{2} (42.5/sq mi)
- Time zone: UTC+01:00 (CET)
  - Summer (DST): UTC+02:00 (CEST)
- INSEE/Postal code: 36073 /36160
- ^{1} French Land Register data, which excludes lakes, ponds, glaciers > 1 km^{2} (0.386 sq mi or 247 acres) and river estuaries.

Feusines (French pronunciation: [føzin]) is a commune in the Indre department in central France.

== Population ==
Historical population
Year	Pop.	±% p.a.
1968	339	—
1975	329	−0.43%
1982	267	−2.94%
1990	214	−2.73%
1999	192	−1.20%
2007	201	+0.57%
2012	206	+0.49%
2017	211	+0.48%
2023	205	−0.48%
Source: INSEE

== See also ==
- Communes of the Indre department
