= Montipouret =

- Commune
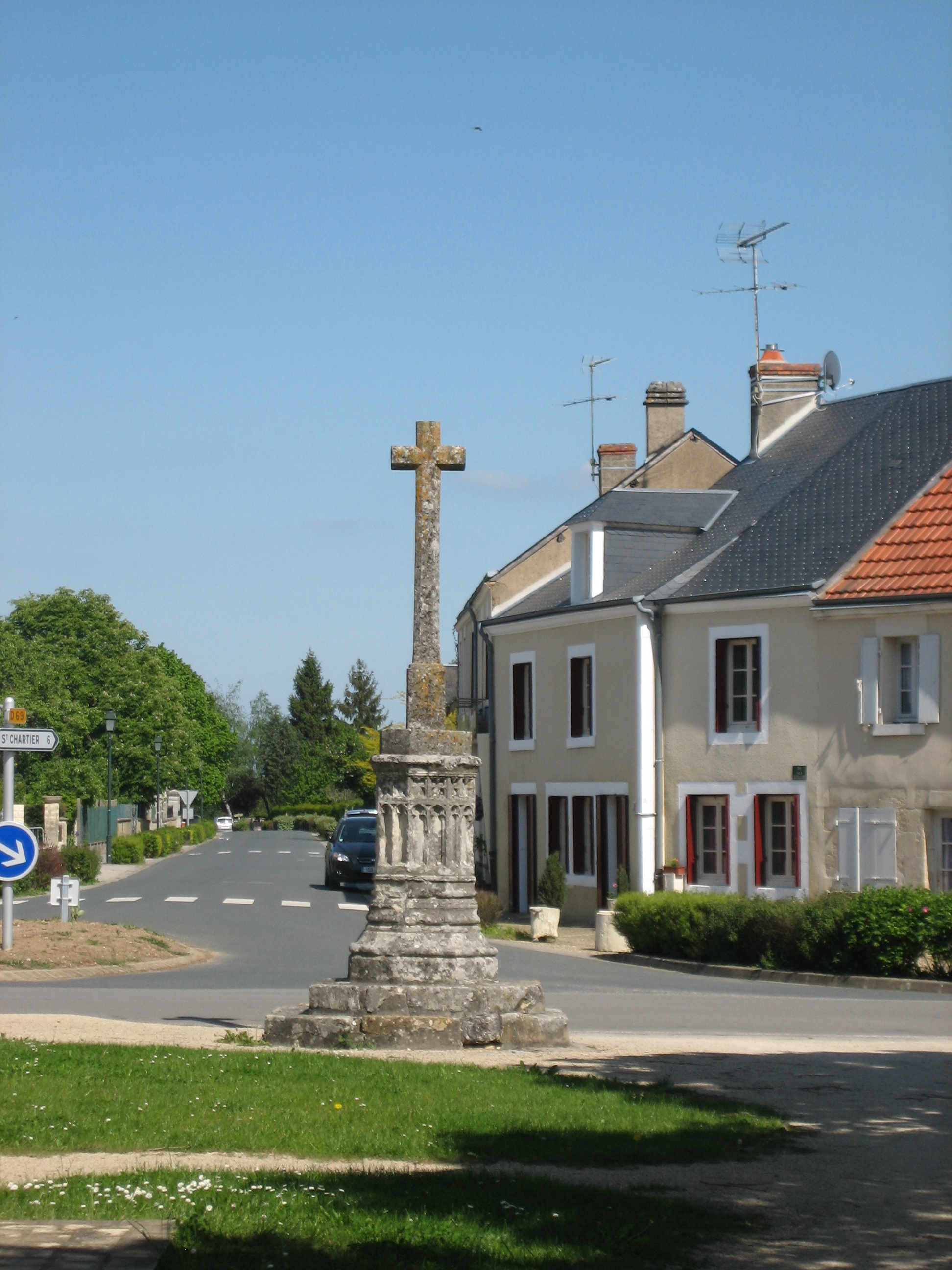
- The cross in Montipouret
- Location of Montipouret
- Location within France Location within Centre-Val de Loire
- Coordinates: 46°39′00″N 1°54′03″E
- Country: France
- Region: Centre-Val de Loire
- Department: Indre
- Arrondissement: La Châtre
- Canton: Neuvy-Saint-Sépulchre

Government
  - Mayor (2020–2026): Marie-Christine Mercier
- Area^{1}: 27.89 km^{2} (10.77 sq mi)
- Elevation: 170 m (560 ft)
- Highest elevation: 259 m (850 ft)
- Lowest elevation: 170 m (560 ft)
- Population (2023): 616
  - Density: 22.1/km^{2} (57.2/sq mi)
- Time zone: UTC+01:00 (CET)
  - Summer (DST): UTC+02:00 (CEST)
- INSEE/Postal code: 36129 /36230
- ^{1} French Land Register data, which excludes lakes, ponds, glaciers > 1 km^{2} (0.386 sq mi or 247 acres) and river estuaries.

Montipouret (French pronunciation: [mɔ̃tipuʁɛ]) is a commune in the Indre department in central France.

== Population ==
Historical population
| Year | Pop. | ±% p.a. |
|---|---|---|
| 1968 | 609 | — |
| 1975 | 533 | −1.89% |
| 1982 | 502 | −0.85% |
| 1990 | 514 | +0.30% |
| 1999 | 507 | −0.15% |
| 2007 | 567 | +1.41% |
| 2012 | 577 | +0.35% |
| 2017 | 556 | −0.74% |
| 2023 | 616 | +1.72% |
Source: INSEE

== See also ==
- Communes of the Indre department
