= Saint-Aubin, Indre =

Saint-Aubin
- Commune
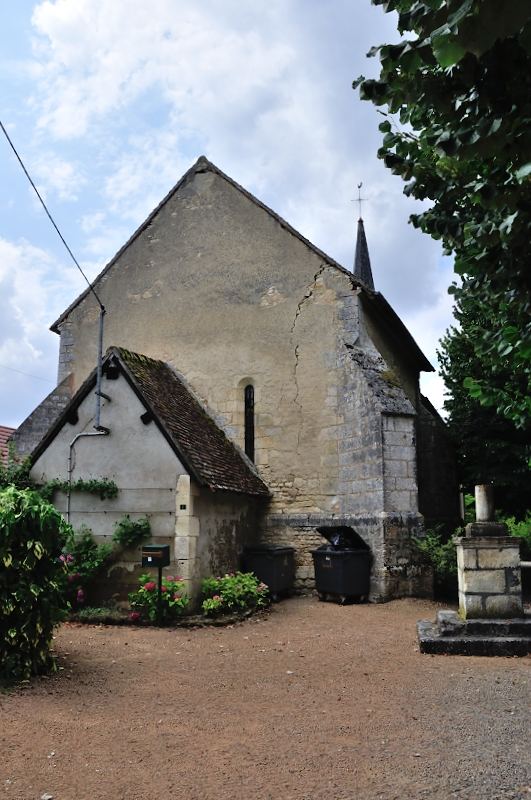
- The church of Saint-Aubin, in Saint-Aubin

- Coat of arms
- Location of Saint-Aubin
- Location within France Location within Centre-Val de Loire
- Coordinates: 46°51′08″N 2°01′30″E
- Country: France
- Region: Centre-Val de Loire
- Department: Indre
- Arrondissement: Issoudun
- Canton: La Châtre

Government
  - Mayor (2020–2026): Gérard Bailly
- Area^{1}: 28.32 km^{2} (10.93 sq mi)
- Elevation: 160 m (520 ft)
- Highest elevation: 181 m (594 ft)
- Lowest elevation: 142 m (466 ft)
- Population (2023): 148
  - Density: 5.23/km^{2} (13.5/sq mi)
- Time zone: UTC+01:00 (CET)
  - Summer (DST): UTC+02:00 (CEST)
- INSEE/Postal code: 36181 /36100
- ^{1} French Land Register data, which excludes lakes, ponds, glaciers > 1 km^{2} (0.386 sq mi or 247 acres) and river estuaries.

Saint-Aubin (French pronunciation: [sɛ̃.t‿obɛ̃]) is a commune in the Indre department in central France.

== Population ==
Historical population
Year	Pop.	±% p.a.
1968	183	—
1975	142	−3.56%
1982	126	−1.69%
1990	155	+2.62%
1999	169	+0.97%
2007	165	−0.30%
2012	204	+4.33%
2017	180	−2.47%
2023	148	−3.21%
Source: INSEE

== See also ==
- Communes of the Indre department
