= La Châtre =

- Subprefecture and commune
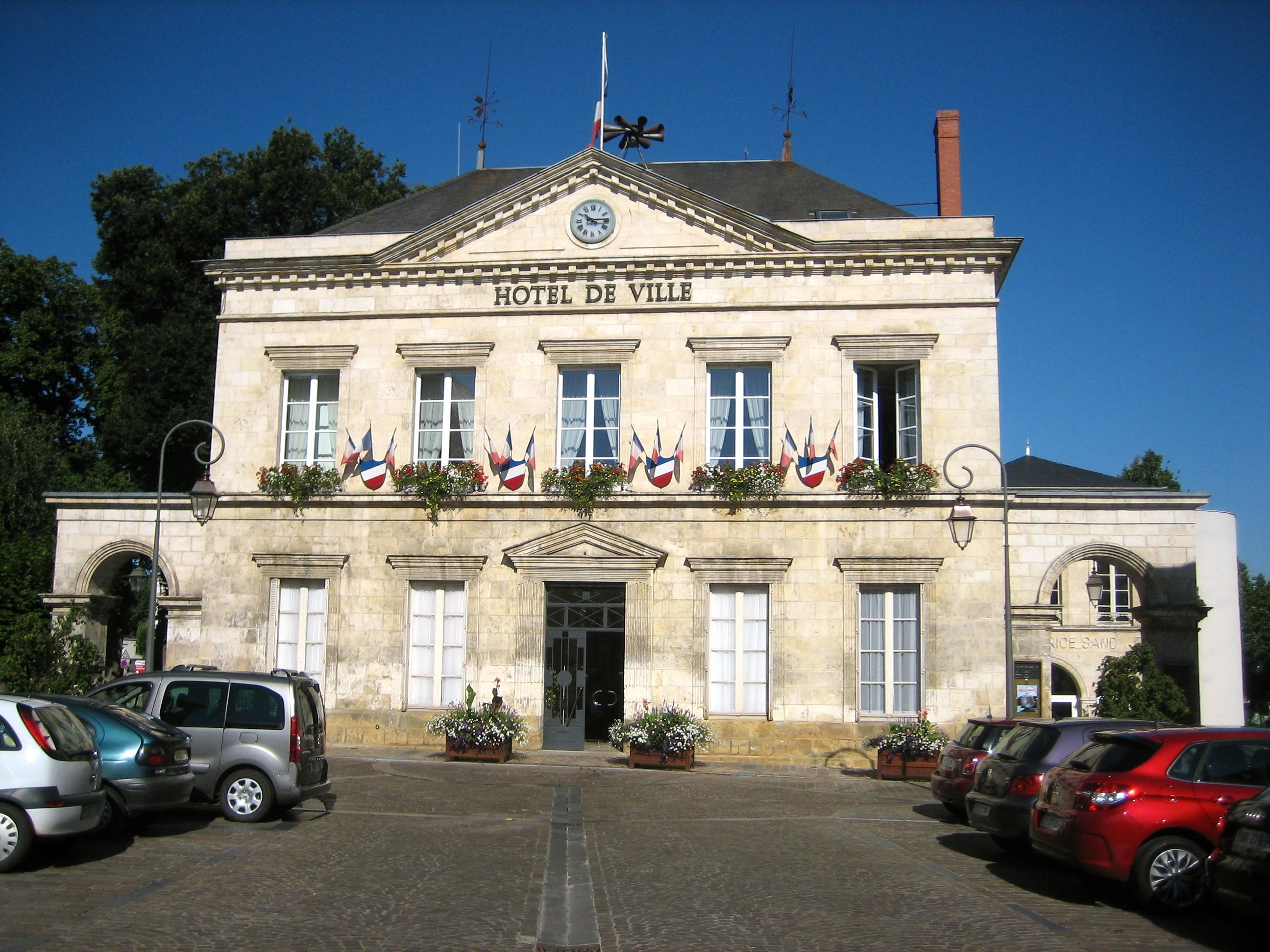
- Town hall

- Flag Coat of arms
- Location of La Châtre
- Location within France Location within Centre-Val de Loire
- Coordinates: 46°34′59″N 1°59′16″E
- Country: France
- Region: Centre-Val de Loire
- Department: Indre
- Arrondissement: La Châtre
- Canton: La Châtre

Government
  - Mayor (2020–2026): Patrick Judalet
- Area^{1}: 6.06 km^{2} (2.34 sq mi)
- Elevation: 222 m (728 ft)
- Highest elevation: 263 m (863 ft)
- Lowest elevation: 198 m (650 ft)
- Population (2023): 4,037
  - Density: 666/km^{2} (1,730/sq mi)
- Time zone: UTC+01:00 (CET)
  - Summer (DST): UTC+02:00 (CEST)
- INSEE/Postal code: 36046 /36400
- ^{1} French Land Register data, which excludes lakes, ponds, glaciers > 1 km^{2} (0.386 sq mi or 247 acres) and river estuaries.

La Châtre (French pronunciation: [la ʃatʁ]) is a commune in the Indre department in central France.

== Population ==
Historical population

Year	Pop.	±% p.a.
1793	4,000	—
1800	3,357	−2.47%
1806	3,926	+2.64%
1821	4,049	+0.21%
1831	4,343	+0.70%
1836	4,471	+0.58%
1841	4,635	+0.72%
1846	4,910	+1.16%
1851	4,970	+0.24%
1856	4,981	+0.04%
1861	5,038	+0.23%
1866	5,167	+0.51%
1872	4,928	−0.79%
1876	4,993	+0.33%
1881	5,234	+0.95%
1886	5,215	−0.07%
1891	5,048	−0.65%
1896	4,850	−0.80%
1901	4,737	−0.47%

Year	Pop.	±% p.a.
1906	4,744	+0.03%
1911	4,770	+0.11%
1921	3,931	−1.92%
1926	3,880	−0.26%
1931	3,734	−0.76%
1936	3,779	+0.24%
1946	4,109	+0.84%
1954	4,110	+0.00%
1962	4,025	−0.26%
1968	4,524	+1.97%
1975	4,847	+0.99%
1982	4,922	+0.22%
1990	4,623	−0.78%
1999	4,547	−0.18%
2007	4,477	−0.19%
2012	4,352	−0.56%
2017	4,109	−1.14%
2023	4,037	−0.29%

Source: EHESS and INSEE (1968-2023)

== Personalities ==
- It was the birthplace of Henri de Latouche and Emile Acollas. André Boillot the auto racing driver crashed here in 1932 and died from his injuries.
- George Sand lived for most of her life at Nohant-Vic near La Châtre.
- From 1938 to his death in 1953, Jean de Boschère lived in La Châtre with his companion Elizabeth d'Ennetières.
- Birthplace of Adolphe-Simon Neboux (1806–1844), surgeon and naturalist

== Climate ==
Climate data for La Châtre (Sainte-Sévère-sur-Indre), elevation 302 m (991 ft), (1991–2020 normals, extremes 1941–present)
Month	Jan	Feb	Mar	Apr	May	Jun	Jul	Aug	Sep	Oct	Nov	Dec	Year
Record high °C (°F)	19.9 (67.8)	24.0 (75.2)	29.8 (85.6)	31.0 (87.8)	34.0 (93.2)	41.0 (105.8)	41.4 (106.5)	41.6 (106.9)	36.6 (97.9)	33.2 (91.8)	26.4 (79.5)	22.6 (72.7)	41.6 (106.9)
Mean daily maximum °C (°F)	8.0 (46.4)	9.2 (48.6)	13.3 (55.9)	16.4 (61.5)	20.3 (68.5)	24.1 (75.4)	26.6 (79.9)	26.7 (80.1)	22.4 (72.3)	17.5 (63.5)	11.9 (53.4)	8.7 (47.7)	17.1 (62.8)
Daily mean °C (°F)	4.8 (40.6)	5.3 (41.5)	8.3 (46.9)	10.8 (51.4)	14.5 (58.1)	18.1 (64.6)	20.2 (68.4)	20.3 (68.5)	16.5 (61.7)	12.9 (55.2)	8.2 (46.8)	5.5 (41.9)	12.1 (53.8)
Mean daily minimum °C (°F)	1.6 (34.9)	1.3 (34.3)	3.3 (37.9)	5.3 (41.5)	8.7 (47.7)	12.1 (53.8)	13.9 (57.0)	13.9 (57.0)	10.5 (50.9)	8.4 (47.1)	4.6 (40.3)	2.2 (36.0)	7.2 (45.0)
Record low °C (°F)	−19.4 (−2.9)	−18.5 (−1.3)	−13.8 (7.2)	−6.4 (20.5)	−11.0 (12.2)	0.4 (32.7)	4.0 (39.2)	2.1 (35.8)	−2.0 (28.4)	−8.0 (17.6)	−11.6 (11.1)	−16.4 (2.5)	−19.4 (−2.9)
Average precipitation mm (inches)	69.9 (2.75)	61.1 (2.41)	59.1 (2.33)	71.5 (2.81)	84.0 (3.31)	65.1 (2.56)	62.7 (2.47)	65.1 (2.56)	71.9 (2.83)	78.3 (3.08)	76.8 (3.02)	78.4 (3.09)	843.9 (33.22)
Average precipitation days (≥ 1.0 mm)	12.6	11.7	10.5	11.0	11.6	9.5	8.4	8.2	8.9	11.9	12.9	13.2	130.3
Source: Meteociel

== See also ==
- Saint-Benoît-du-Sault
- Communes of the Indre department
