= Néret =

- Commune
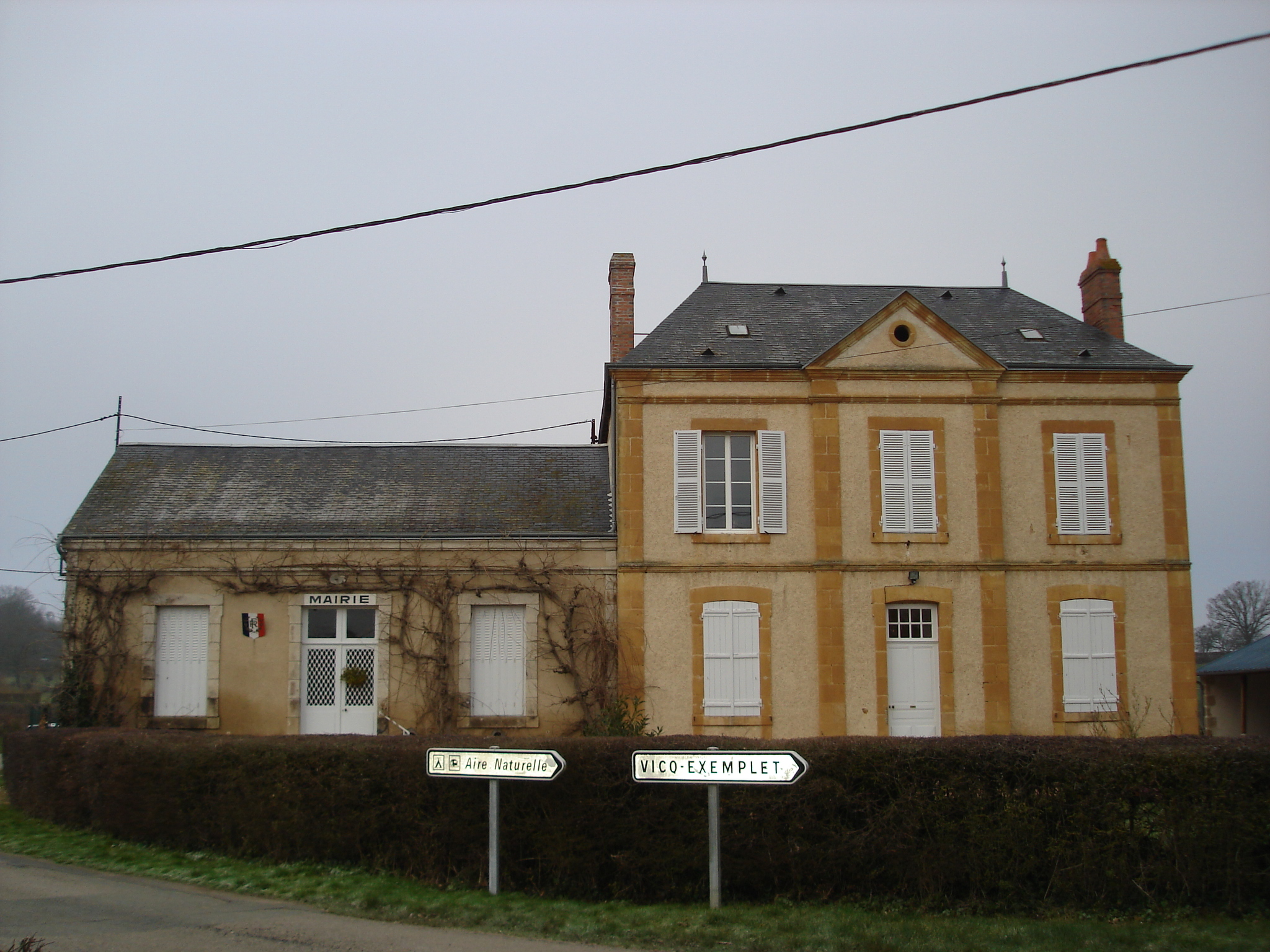
- The town hall in Néret
- Location of Néret
- Location within France Location within Centre-Val de Loire
- Coordinates: 46°34′11″N 2°08′58″E
- Country: France
- Region: Centre-Val de Loire
- Department: Indre
- Arrondissement: La Châtre
- Canton: La Châtre
- Intercommunality: La Châtre et Sainte-Sévère

Government
  - Mayor (2020–2026): Jean-Michel Medar
- Area^{1}: 19.05 km^{2} (7.36 sq mi)
- Elevation: 230 m (750 ft)
- Highest elevation: 282 m (925 ft)
- Lowest elevation: 219 m (719 ft)
- Population (2023): 186
  - Density: 9.76/km^{2} (25.3/sq mi)
- Time zone: UTC+01:00 (CET)
  - Summer (DST): UTC+02:00 (CEST)
- INSEE/Postal code: 36138 /36400
- ^{1} French Land Register data, which excludes lakes, ponds, glaciers > 1 km^{2} (0.386 sq mi or 247 acres) and river estuaries.

Néret (French pronunciation: [neʁɛ]) is a commune in the Indre department in central France.

== Population ==
Historical population
Year	Pop.	±% p.a.
1968	316	—
1975	253	−3.13%
1982	233	−1.17%
1990	208	−1.41%
1999	208	+0.00%
2007	210	+0.12%
2012	217	+0.66%
2017	191	−2.52%
2023	186	−0.44%
Source: INSEE

== See also ==
- Communes of the Indre department
