= Thizay, Indre =

Thizay
- Commune
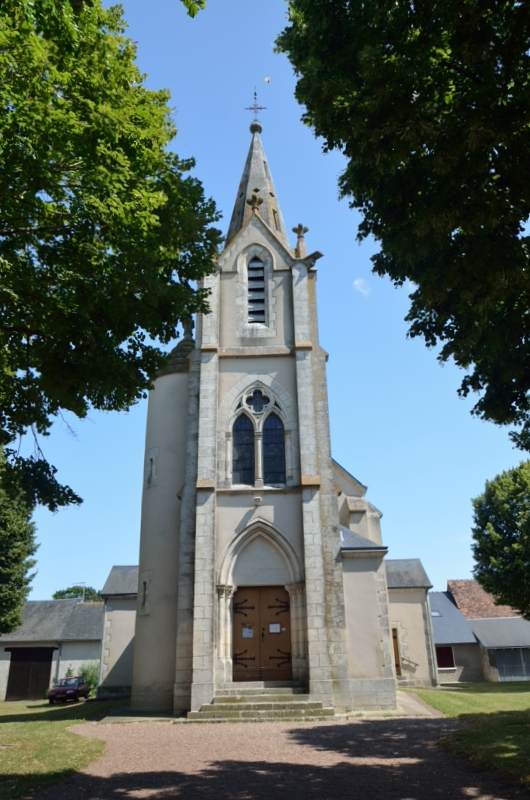
- The church of Our Lady, in Thizay

- Coat of arms
- Location of Thizay
- Location within France Location within Centre-Val de Loire
- Coordinates: 46°53′56″N 1°54′43″E
- Country: France
- Region: Centre-Val de Loire
- Department: Indre
- Arrondissement: Issoudun
- Canton: La Châtre
- Intercommunality: Champagne Boischauts

Government
  - Mayor (2020–2026): Roland Bregeon
- Area^{1}: 16.65 km^{2} (6.43 sq mi)
- Elevation: 147 m (482 ft)
- Highest elevation: 169 m (554 ft)
- Lowest elevation: 130 m (430 ft)
- Population (2023): 227
  - Density: 13.6/km^{2} (35.3/sq mi)
- Time zone: UTC+01:00 (CET)
  - Summer (DST): UTC+02:00 (CEST)
- INSEE/Postal code: 36222 /36100
- ^{1} French Land Register data, which excludes lakes, ponds, glaciers > 1 km^{2} (0.386 sq mi or 247 acres) and river estuaries.

Thizay (French pronunciation: [tizɛ]) is a commune in the Indre department in central France.

== Population ==
Historical population
Year	Pop.	±% p.a.
1968	300	—
1975	262	−1.92%
1982	245	−0.95%
1990	220	−1.34%
1999	250	+1.43%
2007	254	+0.20%
2012	254	+0.00%
2017	232	−1.80%
2023	227	−0.36%
Source: INSEE

== See also ==
- Communes of the Indre department
