= Vigoulant =

- Commune
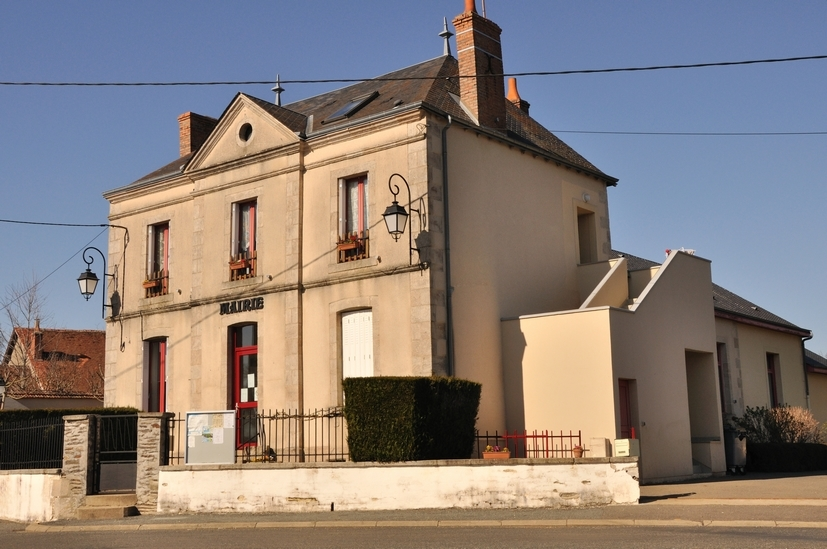
- Town hall
- Location of Vigoulant
- Location within France Location within Centre-Val de Loire
- Coordinates: 46°26′20″N 2°04′21″E
- Country: France
- Region: Centre-Val de Loire
- Department: Indre
- Arrondissement: La Châtre
- Canton: La Châtre

Government
  - Mayor (2020–2026): René Génichon
- Area^{1}: 9.71 km^{2} (3.75 sq mi)
- Elevation: 346 m (1,135 ft)
- Highest elevation: 426 m (1,398 ft)
- Lowest elevation: 270 m (890 ft)
- Population (2023): 97
  - Density: 10/km^{2} (26/sq mi)
- Time zone: UTC+01:00 (CET)
  - Summer (DST): UTC+02:00 (CEST)
- INSEE/Postal code: 36238 /36160
- ^{1} French Land Register data, which excludes lakes, ponds, glaciers > 1 km^{2} (0.386 sq mi or 247 acres) and river estuaries.

Vigoulant (French pronunciation: [viɡulɑ̃]) is a commune in the Indre department in central France.

== Population ==
Historical population
Year	Pop.	±% p.a.
1968	227	—
1975	175	−3.65%
1982	135	−3.64%
1990	104	−3.21%
1999	109	+0.52%
2007	132	+2.42%
2012	125	−1.08%
2017	102	−3.99%
2023	97	−0.83%
Source: INSEE

== See also ==
- Communes of the Indre department
