= Pouligny-Notre-Dame =

- Commune
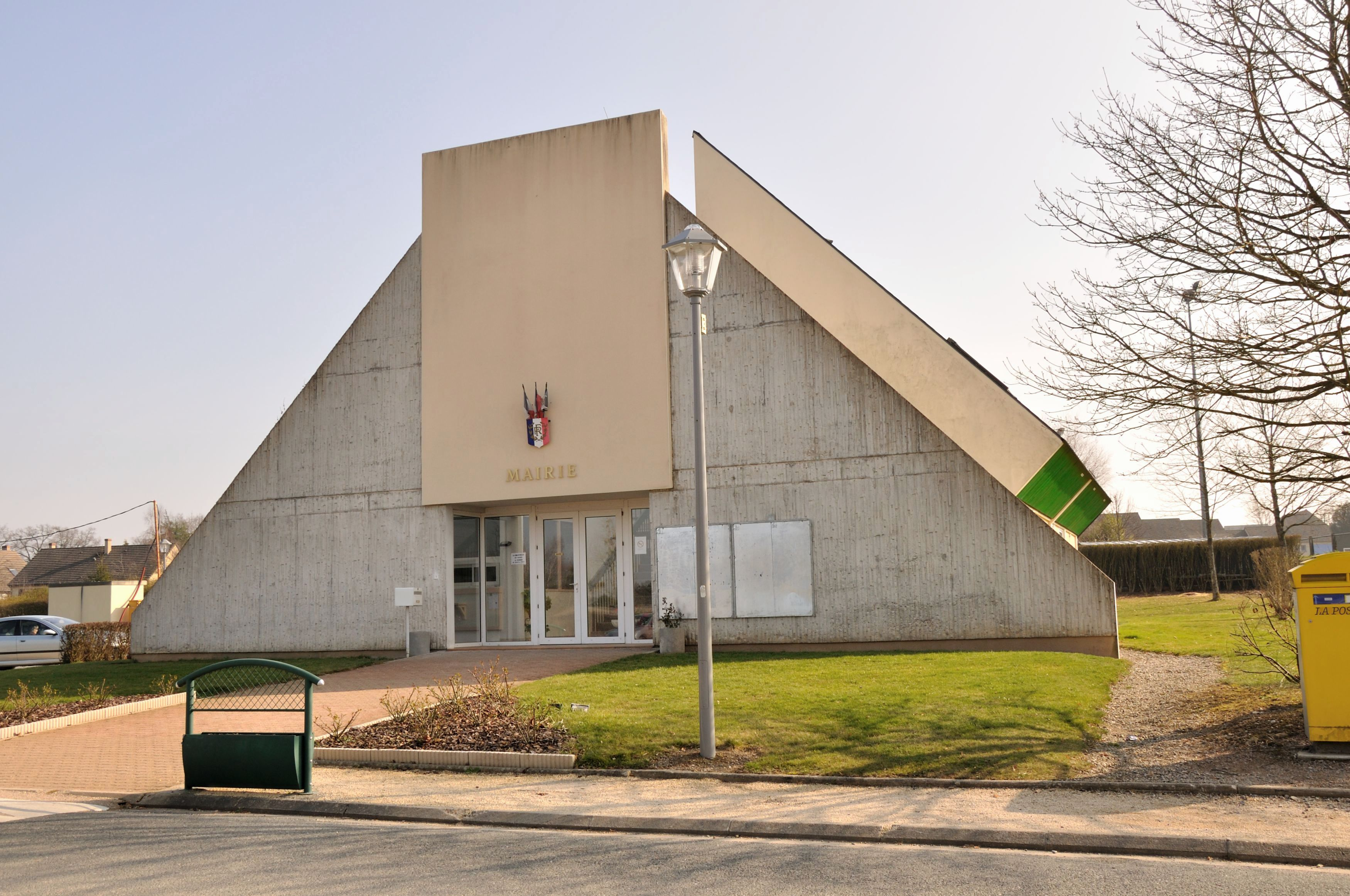
- The town hall in Pouligny-Notre-Dame
- Location of Pouligny-Notre-Dame
- Location within France Location within Centre-Val de Loire
- Coordinates: 46°28′56″N 2°00′15″E
- Country: France
- Region: Centre-Val de Loire
- Department: Indre
- Arrondissement: La Châtre
- Canton: La Châtre
- Intercommunality: La Châtre Sainte-Sévère

Government
  - Mayor (2020–2026): Samuel Devaux
- Area^{1}: 33.75 km^{2} (13.03 sq mi)
- Elevation: 330 m (1,080 ft)
- Highest elevation: 456 m (1,496 ft)
- Lowest elevation: 239 m (784 ft)
- Population (2023): 639
  - Density: 18.9/km^{2} (49.0/sq mi)
- Time zone: UTC+01:00 (CET)
  - Summer (DST): UTC+02:00 (CEST)
- INSEE/Postal code: 36163 /36160
- ^{1} French Land Register data, which excludes lakes, ponds, glaciers > 1 km^{2} (0.386 sq mi or 247 acres) and river estuaries.

Pouligny-Notre-Dame (French pronunciation: [puliɲi nɔtʁ dam]) is a commune in the Indre department in central France.

== Population ==
Historical population
Year	Pop.	±% p.a.
1968	773	—
1975	698	−1.45%
1982	664	−0.71%
1990	661	−0.06%
1999	605	−0.98%
2007	629	+0.49%
2012	631	+0.06%
2017	720	+2.67%
2023	639	−1.97%
Source: INSEE

== See also ==
- Communes of the Indre department
