= Canton of La Châtre =

Coordinates: 46.58°N 1.99°E

The canton of La Châtre is an administrative division of the Indre department, central France. Its borders were modified at the French canton reorganisation which came into effect in March 2015. Its seat is in La Châtre.

It consists of the following communes:

1. La Berthenoux
2. Bommiers
3. Briantes
4. Brives
5. Champillet
6. La Châtre
7. Condé
8. Feusines
9. Lacs
10. Lignerolles
11. Lourouer-Saint-Laurent
12. Meunet-Planches
13. Montlevicq
14. La Motte-Feuilly
15. Néret
16. Neuvy-Pailloux
17. Nohant-Vic
18. Pérassay
19. Pouligny-Notre-Dame
20. Pouligny-Saint-Martin
21. Pruniers
22. Saint-Août
23. Saint-Aubin
24. Saint-Chartier
25. Saint-Christophe-en-Boucherie
26. Sainte-Sévère-sur-Indre
27. Sazeray
28. Thevet-Saint-Julien
29. Thizay
30. Urciers
31. Verneuil-sur-Igneraie
32. Vicq-Exemplet
33. Vigoulant
34. Vijon
