= Crozon-sur-Vauvre =

- Commune
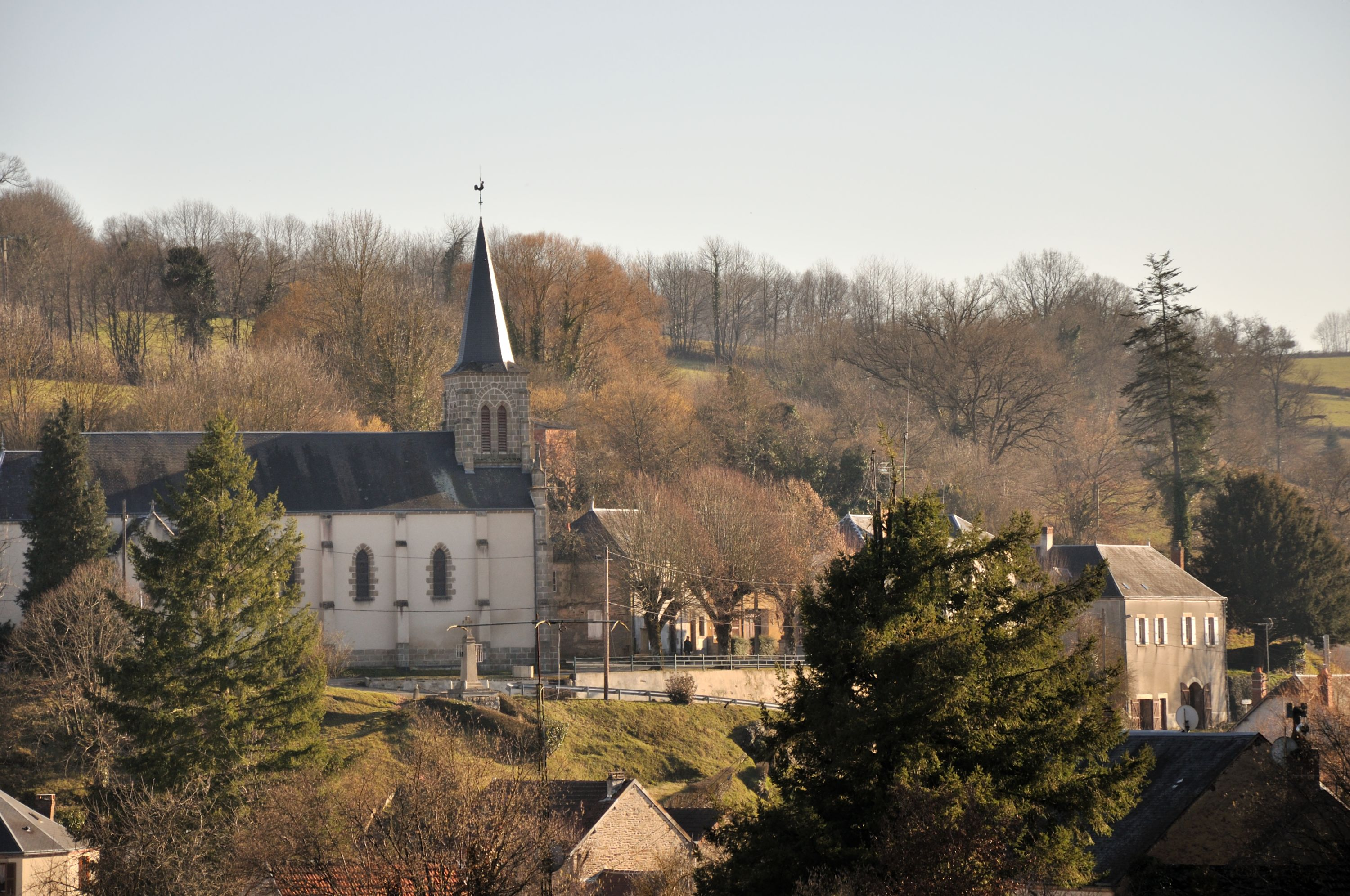
- The church and surroundings, in Crozon-sur-Vauvre
- Location of Crozon-sur-Vauvre
- Location within France Location within Centre-Val de Loire
- Coordinates: 46°29′22″N 1°52′16″E
- Country: France
- Region: Centre-Val de Loire
- Department: Indre
- Arrondissement: La Châtre
- Canton: Neuvy-Saint-Sépulchre
- Intercommunality: Marche berrichonne

Government
  - Mayor (2020–2026): Bernard Mitaty
- Area^{1}: 27.69 km^{2} (10.69 sq mi)
- Elevation: 420 m (1,380 ft)
- Highest elevation: 450 m (1,480 ft)
- Lowest elevation: 237 m (778 ft)
- Population (2023): 335
  - Density: 12.1/km^{2} (31.3/sq mi)
- Time zone: UTC+01:00 (CET)
  - Summer (DST): UTC+02:00 (CEST)
- INSEE/Postal code: 36061 /36140
- ^{1} French Land Register data, which excludes lakes, ponds, glaciers > 1 km^{2} (0.386 sq mi or 247 acres) and river estuaries.

Crozon-sur-Vauvre (French pronunciation: [kʁozɔ̃ syʁ vovʁ]) is a commune in the Indre department in the Centre-Val de Loire region of France.

Crozon-sur-Vauvre was in the historic province of Berry up to 1790.

Prior to the Redécoupage cantonal de 2014 it was in the canton of Aigurande.

== Population ==
Historical population
| Year | Pop. | ±% p.a. |
|---|---|---|
| 1968 | 733 | — |
| 1975 | 625 | −2.25% |
| 1982 | 543 | −1.99% |
| 1990 | 450 | −2.32% |
| 1999 | 388 | −1.63% |
| 2007 | 364 | −0.79% |
| 2012 | 369 | +0.27% |
| 2017 | 340 | −1.62% |
| 2023 | 335 | −0.25% |
Source: INSEE

Citizens of the commune are called Crozonnais in French.

== Geography ==
Crozon-sur-Vauvre lies about 46 kilometres south-southeast of the city of Châteauroux, on the river Vauvre. Crozon-sur-Vauvre's neighbouring settlements are Saint-Denis-de-Jouhet to the north and northwest, Chassignolles to the northeast, Crevant to the east, La Forêt-du-Temple to the south, Aigurande to the west and southwest, and La Buxerette in the west.

== Place of interest ==
- Château de Lalande, 16th century.

== Transport ==
The nearest airport is Châteauroux-Centre.

== See also ==
- Communes of the Indre department
