= Mers-sur-Indre =

- Commune
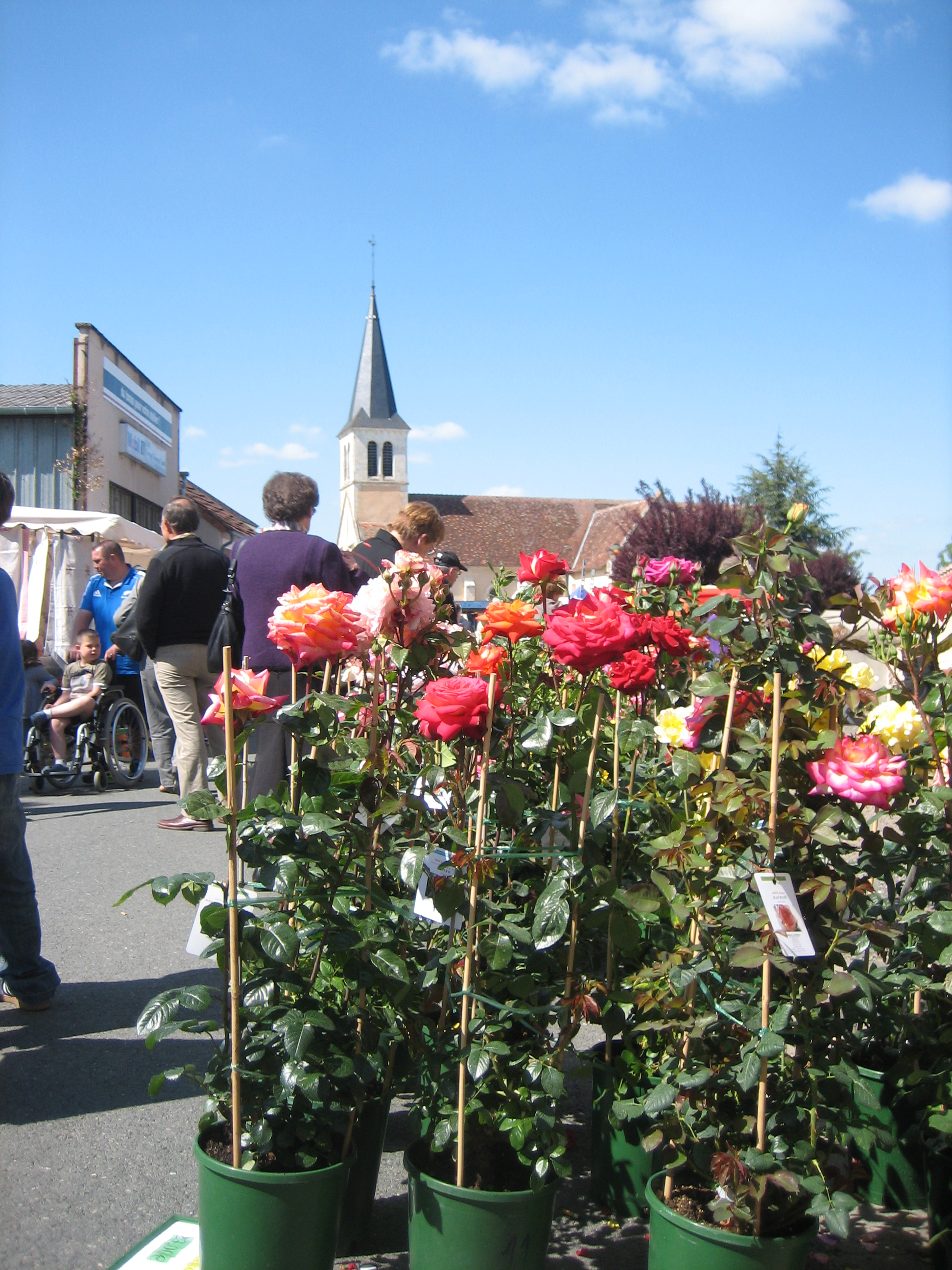
- A scene from the plant fair, with the church in the background
- Location of Mers-sur-Indre
- Location within France Location within Centre-Val de Loire
- Coordinates: 46°39′33″N 1°52′55″E
- Country: France
- Region: Centre-Val de Loire
- Department: Indre
- Arrondissement: La Châtre
- Canton: Neuvy-Saint-Sépulchre

Government
  - Mayor (2020–2026): Christian Robert
- Area^{1}: 25.45 km^{2} (9.83 sq mi)
- Elevation: 184 m (604 ft)
- Highest elevation: 246 m (807 ft)
- Lowest elevation: 164 m (538 ft)
- Population (2023): 659
  - Density: 25.9/km^{2} (67.1/sq mi)
- Time zone: UTC+01:00 (CET)
  - Summer (DST): UTC+02:00 (CEST)
- INSEE/Postal code: 36120 /36230
- ^{1} French Land Register data, which excludes lakes, ponds, glaciers > 1 km^{2} (0.386 sq mi or 247 acres) and river estuaries.

Mers-sur-Indre is a commune in the Indre department in central France.

== History ==
In 2018, the Order of Saint Remi, a traditionalist Catholic order of priests, founded a Chapel in Mers-sur-Indre.

== Population ==
Historical population
Year	Pop.	±% p.a.
1968	565	—
1975	522	−1.12%
1982	434	−2.60%
1990	459	+0.70%
1999	584	+2.71%
2007	574	−0.22%
2012	662	+2.89%
2017	653	−0.27%
2023	659	+0.15%
Source: INSEE

== See also ==
- Communes of the Indre department
