= Fougerolles =

Fougerolles may refer to:

Places

- Fougerolles, Indre, a commune in the French region of Centre
- Fougerolles, Haute-Saône, a former commune in the French region of Franche-Comté, now part of Fougerolles-Saint-Valbert
- Fougerolles-du-Plessis, a commune in the Mayenne department of France

Surname

- Luc de Fougerolles, a Canadian soccer player
- Hélène de Fougerolles, a French actress
