= Montgivray =

- Commune
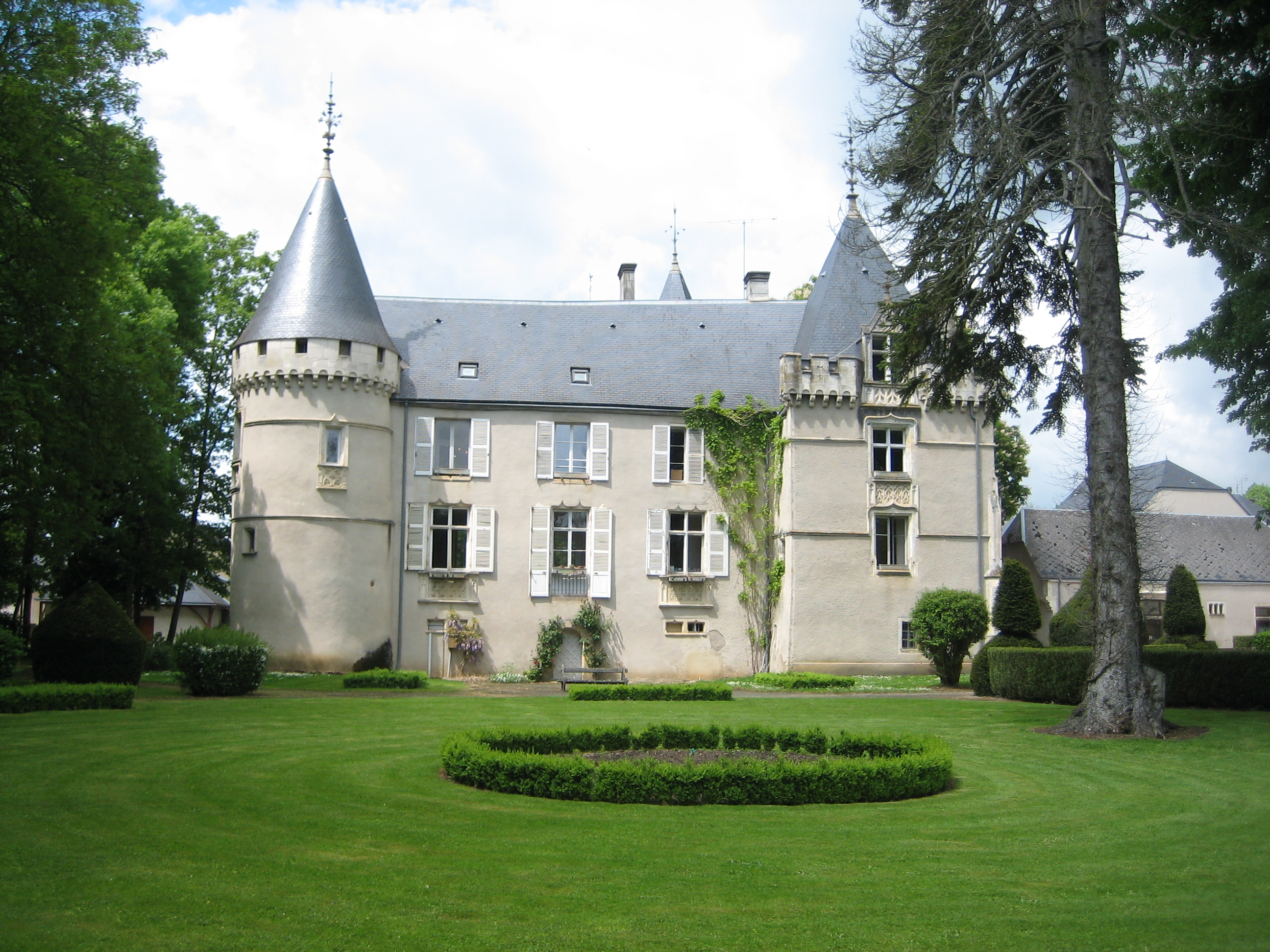
- Town hall in the chateau
- Location of Montgivray
- Location within France Location within Centre-Val de Loire
- Coordinates: 46°36′15″N 1°59′00″E
- Country: France
- Region: Centre-Val de Loire
- Department: Indre
- Arrondissement: La Châtre
- Canton: Neuvy-Saint-Sépulchre
- Intercommunality: La Châtre et Sainte-Sévère

Government
  - Mayor (2020–2026): Michel Blin
- Area^{1}: 25.48 km^{2} (9.84 sq mi)
- Elevation: 208 m (682 ft)
- Highest elevation: 253 m (830 ft)
- Lowest elevation: 187 m (614 ft)
- Population (2023): 1,546
  - Density: 60.68/km^{2} (157.1/sq mi)
- Time zone: UTC+01:00 (CET)
  - Summer (DST): UTC+02:00 (CEST)
- INSEE/Postal code: 36127 /36400
- ^{1} French Land Register data, which excludes lakes, ponds, glaciers > 1 km^{2} (0.386 sq mi or 247 acres) and river estuaries.

Montgivray (French pronunciation: [mɔ̃ʒivʁɛ]) is a commune in the Indre department in central France.

== Population ==
Historical population
Year	Pop.	±% p.a.
1968	1,479	—
1975	1,465	−0.14%
1982	1,517	+0.50%
1990	1,661	+1.14%
1999	1,681	+0.13%
2007	1,667	−0.10%
2012	1,688	+0.25%
2017	1,600	−1.07%
2023	1,546	−0.57%
Source: INSEE

== See also ==
- Communes of the Indre department
