= Orsennes =

- Commune
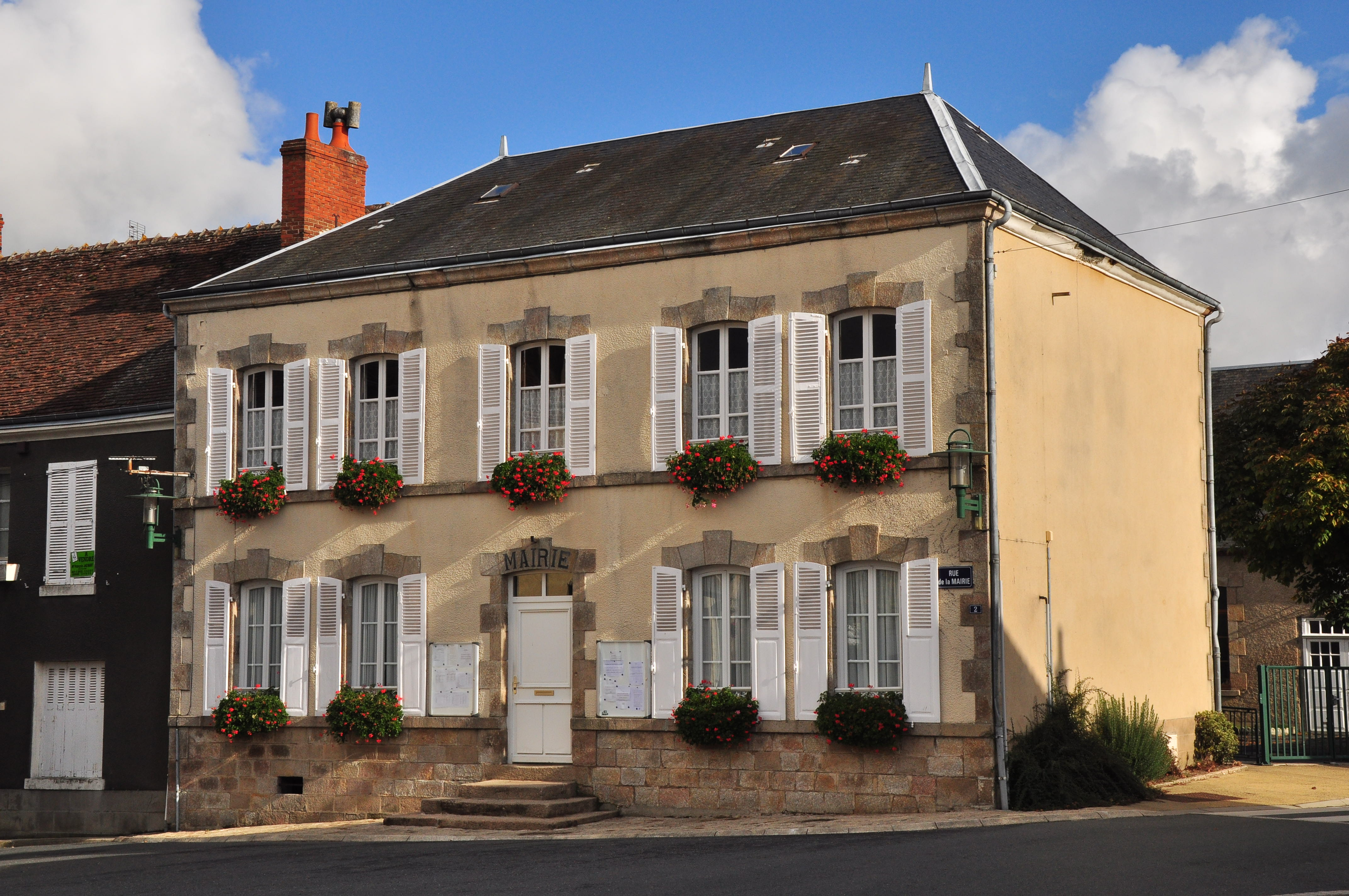
- The town hall in Orsennes

- Coat of arms
- Location of Orsennes
- Location within France Location within Centre-Val de Loire
- Coordinates: 46°28′37″N 1°41′01″E
- Country: France
- Region: Centre-Val de Loire
- Department: Indre
- Arrondissement: La Châtre
- Canton: Neuvy-Saint-Sépulchre

Government
  - Mayor (2020–2026): Laurent Bre
- Area^{1}: 49.28 km^{2} (19.03 sq mi)
- Elevation: 289 m (948 ft)
- Highest elevation: 376 m (1,234 ft)
- Lowest elevation: 209 m (686 ft)
- Population (2023): 696
  - Density: 14.1/km^{2} (36.6/sq mi)
- Time zone: UTC+01:00 (CET)
  - Summer (DST): UTC+02:00 (CEST)
- INSEE/Postal code: 36146 /36190
- ^{1} French Land Register data, which excludes lakes, ponds, glaciers > 1 km^{2} (0.386 sq mi or 247 acres) and river estuaries.

Orsennes (French pronunciation: [ɔʁsɛn]) is a town and commune in the Indre department in central France.

== Population ==
Historical population
Year	Pop.	±% p.a.
1968	1,372	—
1975	1,185	−2.07%
1982	1,015	−2.19%
1990	913	−1.32%
1999	791	−1.58%
2007	816	+0.39%
2012	785	−0.77%
2017	758	−0.70%
2023	696	−1.41%
Source: INSEE

== See also ==
- Communes of the Indre department
