= Château de Sarzay =

Castle in Sarzay, France

Coordinates: 46°36′1.5″N 1°54′24″E

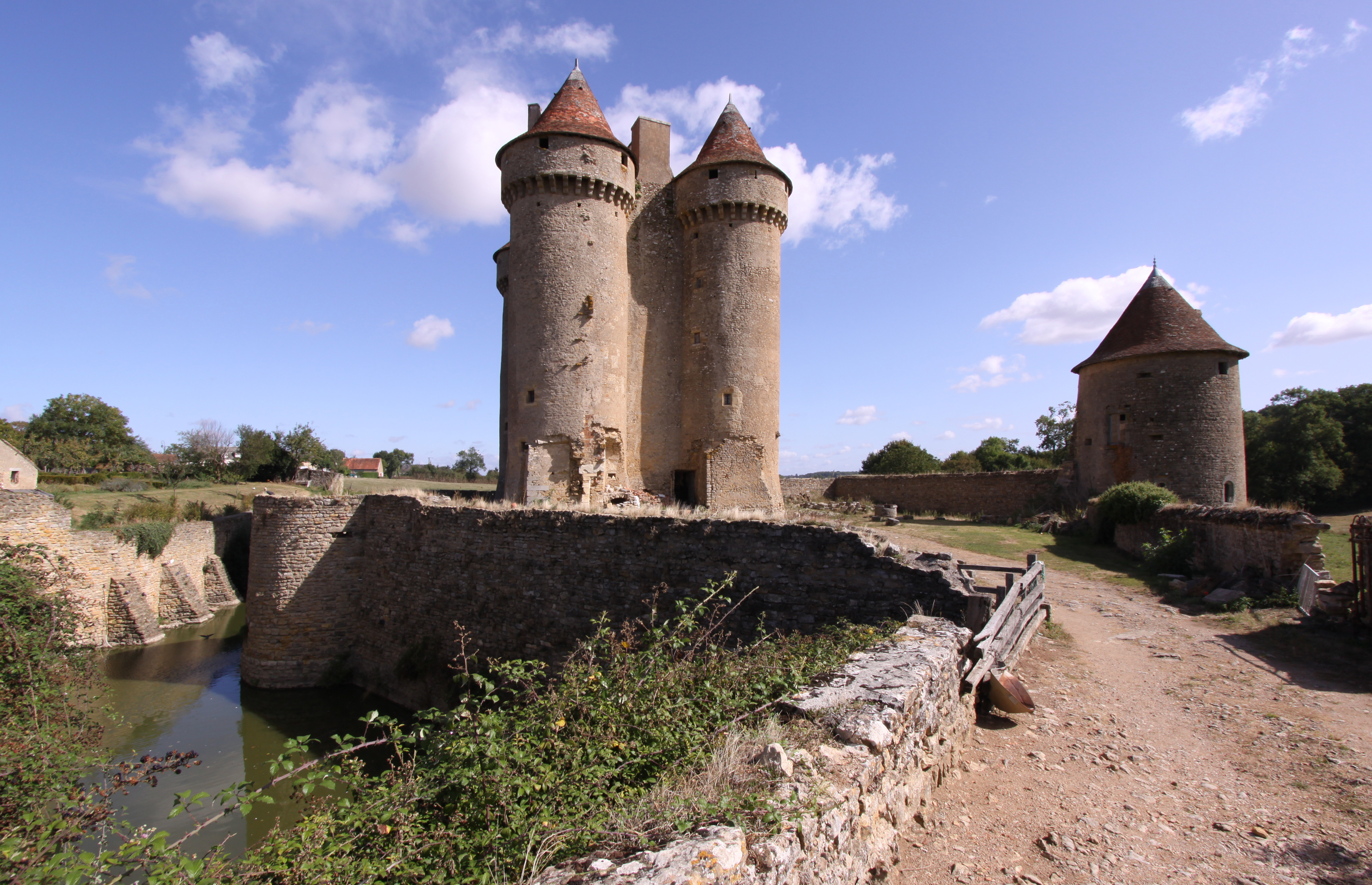
Château de Sarzay, its ditch and the chapel-tower

The Château de Sarzay is a 14th-century castle in the village of Sarzay in the Indre département of France.

This imposing medieval fortress comprises 38 towers and three drawbridges. Numerous furnished rooms maintain their historical authenticity. From the tops of the towers, with their superb carpentry, one can discover the beauty of the surrounding countryside. Restored deep moats, the chapel and the hall complete the beauty of the site.

== History ==
This small village in the Berry province acquired the title of 'City' in 1300. The parish was a dependency of the Archbishop of Bourges.

The manor of Sarzay belonged to the Barbançois family since the middle of the 14th century. They were a family of knights whose sons distinguished themselves in the battles of the Hundred Years War. The family built the castle and remained owners until 1720. Their title was promoted to marquis in 1651.

To begin with, the castle was open ground circled by a ditch and defended by an enclosure of which the only remnant is a chapel-tower. In 1360, the lord of Sarzy, Guillaume de Barbançois, fought the English outside the nearby town of La Châtre, before looting the town. Sarzay was at the edge of the kingdom of France, facing the English possessions of Poitou, Limousin and Aquitaine, and thus formed part of the first line of defence of the kingdom. Around 1440, Jean de Barbançois constructed a hall flanked with five towers, one of which served the various floors. The towers were crowned with machicolations. The castle contained the English invasion. Surviving intact from the Hundred Years War, the Wars of Religion, the Fronde and the French Revolution, it is today one of the most photographed monuments in France.

== George Sand ==
The castle was used as a setting by George Sand in her novel le Meunier d'Angibault (1845).

== Today ==
The castle on two hectares was bought in the end of 1982 by Richard Hurbain and his wife, Francoise, and their three sons for 790,000 francs. Hurbain pledged to restore the moats, build halls in the medieval style, and restore outbuildings as holiday accommodation. The castle is open to the public.

The Château de Sarzay has been classified since 1912 as a monument historique by the French Ministry of Culture.

== See also ==
- List of castles in France
