= Saint-Plantaire =

- Commune
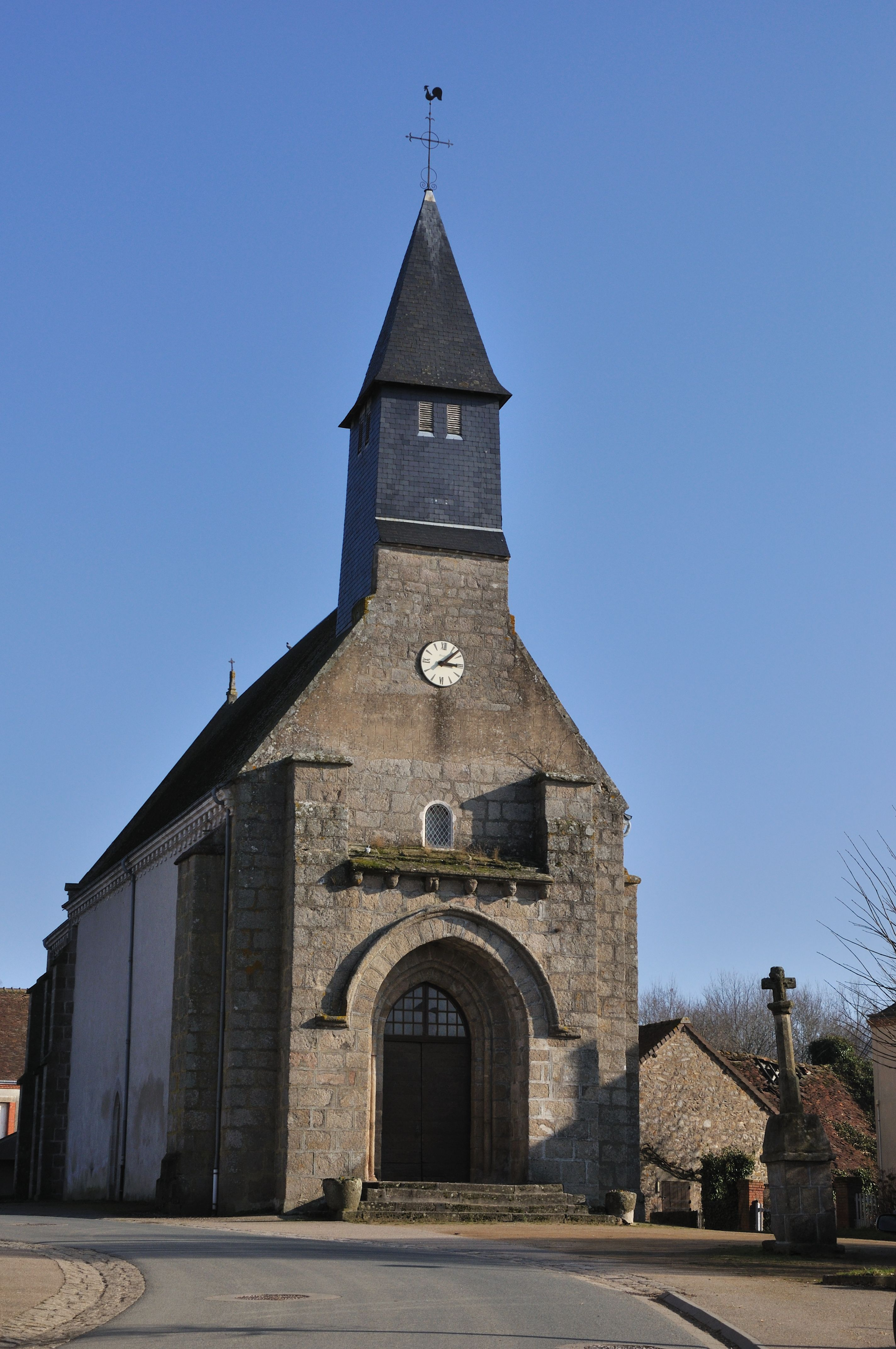
- The church in Saint-Plantaire
- Location of Saint-Plantaire
- Location within France Location within Centre-Val de Loire
- Coordinates: 46°27′29″N 1°40′16″E
- Country: France
- Region: Centre-Val de Loire
- Department: Indre
- Arrondissement: La Châtre
- Canton: Neuvy-Saint-Sépulchre

Government
  - Mayor (2020–2026): Daniel Calame
- Area^{1}: 34.07 km^{2} (13.15 sq mi)
- Elevation: 320 m (1,050 ft)
- Highest elevation: 371 m (1,217 ft)
- Lowest elevation: 197 m (646 ft)
- Population (2023): 601
  - Density: 17.6/km^{2} (45.7/sq mi)
- Time zone: UTC+01:00 (CET)
  - Summer (DST): UTC+02:00 (CEST)
- INSEE/Postal code: 36207 /36190
- ^{1} French Land Register data, which excludes lakes, ponds, glaciers > 1 km^{2} (0.386 sq mi or 247 acres) and river estuaries.

Saint-Plantaire (French pronunciation: [sɛ̃ plɑ̃tɛʁ]; Occitan: Sent Plantair) is a commune in the Indre department in central France.

== Population ==
Historical population
Year	Pop.	±% p.a.
1968	891	—
1975	758	−2.28%
1982	680	−1.54%
1990	605	−1.45%
1999	550	−1.05%
2007	552	+0.05%
2012	562	+0.36%
2017	616	+1.85%
2023	601	−0.41%
Source: INSEE

== See also ==
- Communes of the Indre department
