= Neuvy-Saint-Sépulchre =

- Commune
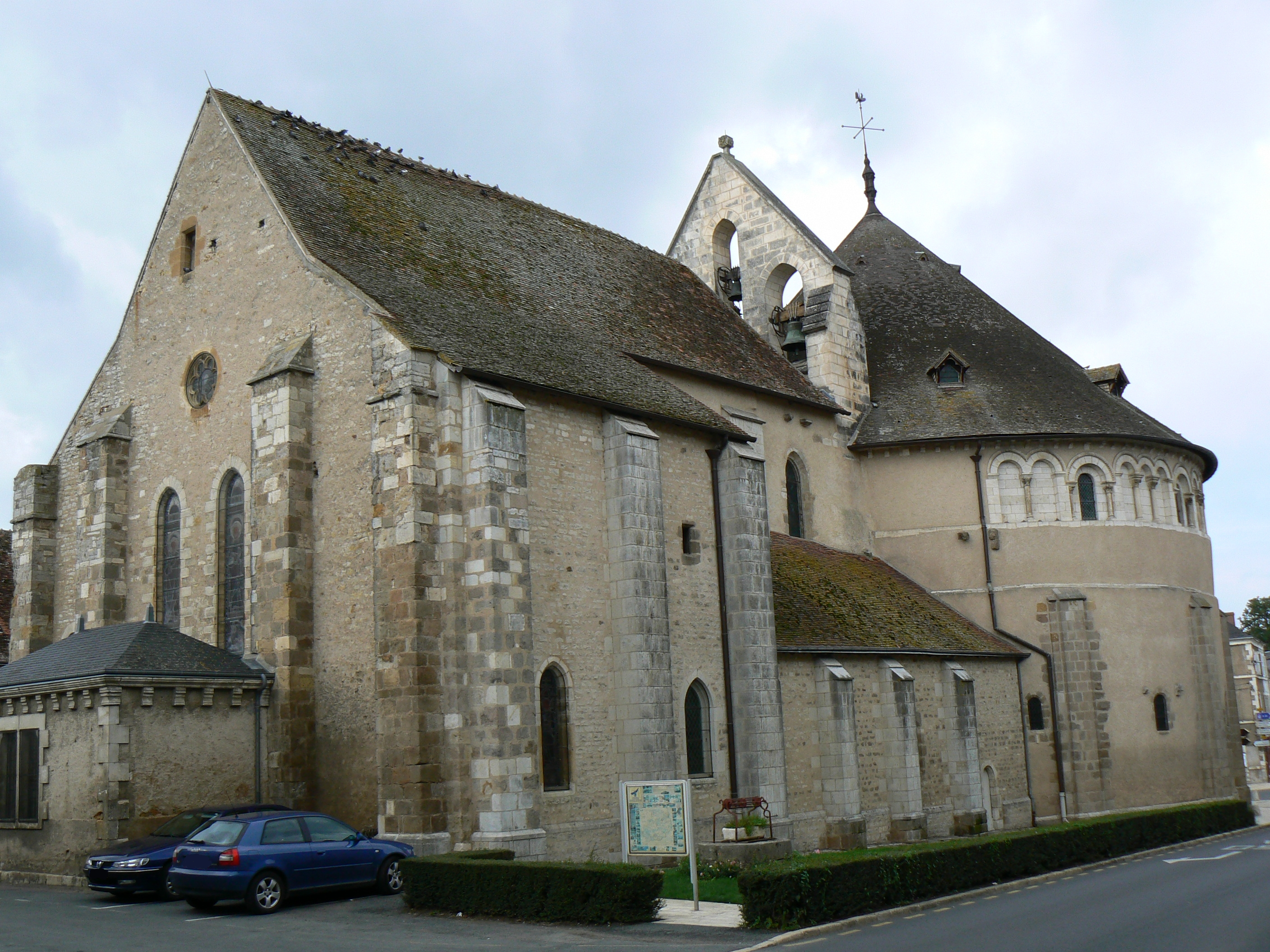
- Saint-Jacques-le-Majeur Basilica

- Coat of arms
- Location of Neuvy-Saint-Sépulchre
- Location within France Location within Centre-Val de Loire
- Coordinates: 46°35′49″N 1°48′34″E
- Country: France
- Region: Centre-Val de Loire
- Department: Indre
- Arrondissement: La Châtre
- Canton: Neuvy-Saint-Sépulchre

Government
  - Mayor (2020–2026): Guy Gautron
- Area^{1}: 35.11 km^{2} (13.56 sq mi)
- Elevation: 191 m (627 ft)
- Highest elevation: 275 m (902 ft)
- Lowest elevation: 166 m (545 ft)
- Population (2023): 1,623
  - Density: 46.23/km^{2} (119.7/sq mi)
- Time zone: UTC+01:00 (CET)
  - Summer (DST): UTC+02:00 (CEST)
- INSEE/Postal code: 36141 /36230
- ^{1} French Land Register data, which excludes lakes, ponds, glaciers > 1 km^{2} (0.386 sq mi or 247 acres) and river estuaries.

Neuvy-Saint-Sépulchre (French pronunciation: [nøvi sɛ̃ sepylkʁ]) is a commune in the Indre department in central France.

== History ==
The town takes its name from its basilica, dedicated to Saint James the Great (French: Basilique Saint-Jacques), which is a replica of the Church of the Holy Sepulchre in Jerusalem. The name of the town is written with an "h" in "sepulchre"; this is reportedly the work of a medieval monk who sought to underscore the beauty of the church by combining the words "sepulcrum" ("tomb") + "pulcher" ("beautiful").

The construction of an original church was finished in 1049; it was dedicated to Saint James the Greater (Saint-Jacques-le-Majeur in French). The building of a new church modelled on the Saint Sepulchre was instigated by the cardinal Eude de Châteauroux upon his return from the crusades. Although the new church was originally to replace the older one entirely, the nave and parts of the ambulatory of the older church were kept when pilgrims reported that the Jerusalem church had been modified to fit a rectangular plan.

The church is surmounted by a dome with a diameter of 22 m. The site of the replica of the Holy Sepulchre lay in the middle of a rotunda of, at ground level, eleven columns representing those Apostles left after the betrayal of Jesus by Judas Iscariot. The church has been listed as a historic monument since 1847. In 2006, it was listed as a UNESCO World Heritage Site as part of the World Heritage Sites of the Routes of Santiago de Compostela in France.

== Geography ==
The commune is traversed by the river Bouzanne.

== Population ==
Historical population
Year	Pop.	±% p.a.
1968	1,804	—
1975	1,762	−0.34%
1982	1,819	+0.46%
1990	1,722	−0.68%
1999	1,654	−0.45%
2007	1,662	+0.06%
2012	1,663	+0.01%
2017	1,653	−0.12%
2023	1,623	−0.30%
Source: INSEE

== See also ==
- Communes of the Indre department
- High medieval domes
