= Sarzay =

- Commune
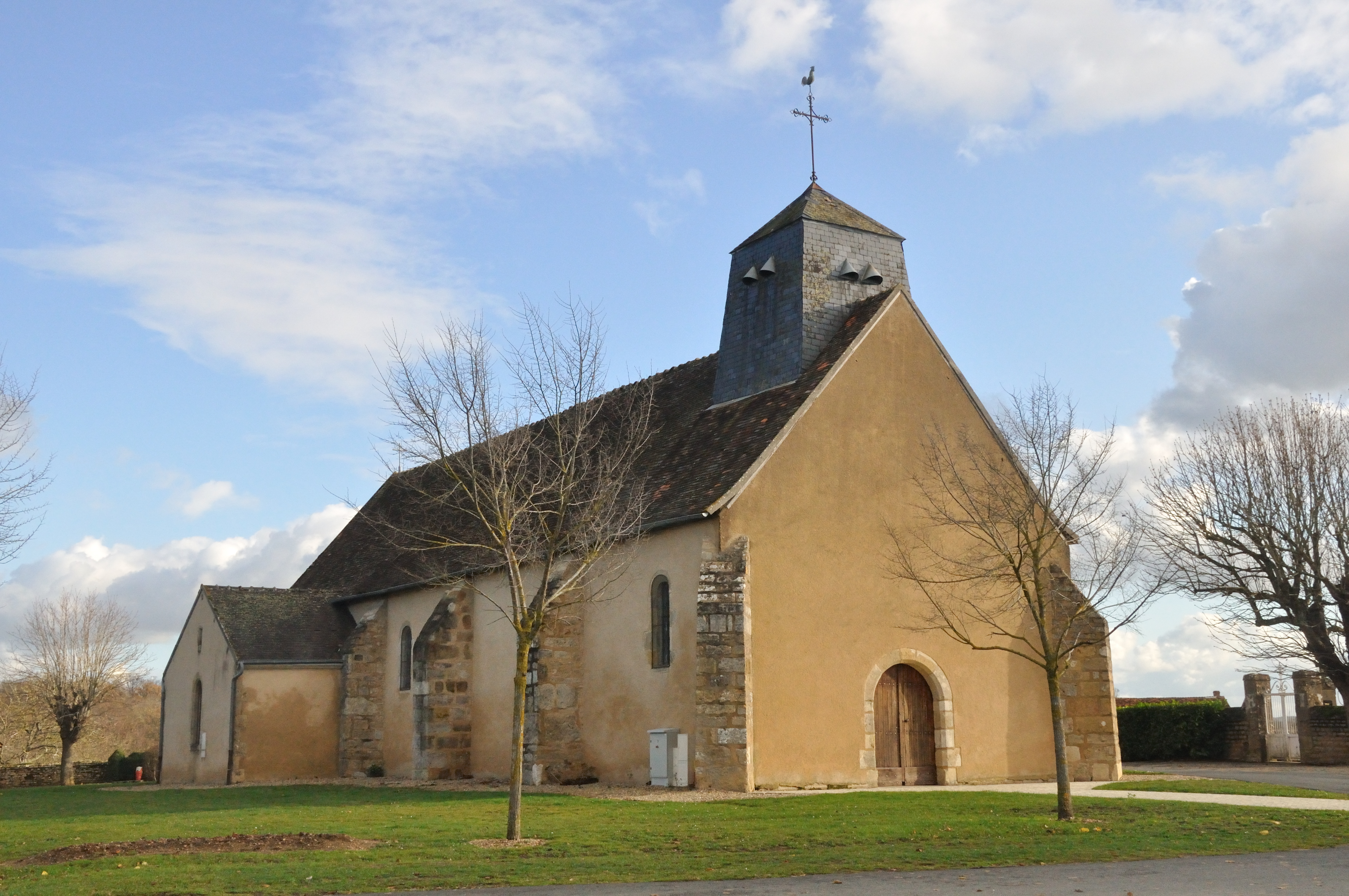
- The church of Saint-Pierre, in Sarzay
- Location of Sarzay
- Location within France Location within Centre-Val de Loire
- Coordinates: 46°36′09″N 1°54′19″E
- Country: France
- Region: Centre-Val de Loire
- Department: Indre
- Arrondissement: La Châtre
- Canton: Neuvy-Saint-Sépulchre

Government
  - Mayor (2020–2026): Chantale Bigrat
- Area^{1}: 18.3 km^{2} (7.1 sq mi)
- Elevation: 220 m (720 ft)
- Highest elevation: 256 m (840 ft)
- Lowest elevation: 183 m (600 ft)
- Population (2023): 301
  - Density: 16.4/km^{2} (42.6/sq mi)
- Time zone: UTC+01:00 (CET)
  - Summer (DST): UTC+02:00 (CEST)
- INSEE/Postal code: 36210 /36230
- ^{1} French Land Register data, which excludes lakes, ponds, glaciers > 1 km^{2} (0.386 sq mi or 247 acres) and river estuaries.

Sarzay (French pronunciation: [saʁzɛ]) is a commune in the Indre department in central France.

== History ==
First mentioned in written records in 1300, Sarzay was a parish of the Archbishop of Bourges. The seigneurie of Sarzay belonged to the Barbançois family, who constructed the castle of Sarzay, and they remained the possessor of the fief until 1720. The fief was transformed into a marquisat in 1651. The castle was the setting for a novel by George Sand, le Meunier d'Angibault.

== Population ==
Historical population
Year	Pop.	±% p.a.
1968	379	—
1975	343	−1.42%
1982	320	−0.99%
1990	319	−0.04%
1999	319	+0.00%
2007	318	−0.04%
2012	325	+0.44%
2017	307	−1.13%
2023	301	−0.33%
Source: INSEE

== See also ==
- Communes of the Indre department
