= Mouhers =

- Commune
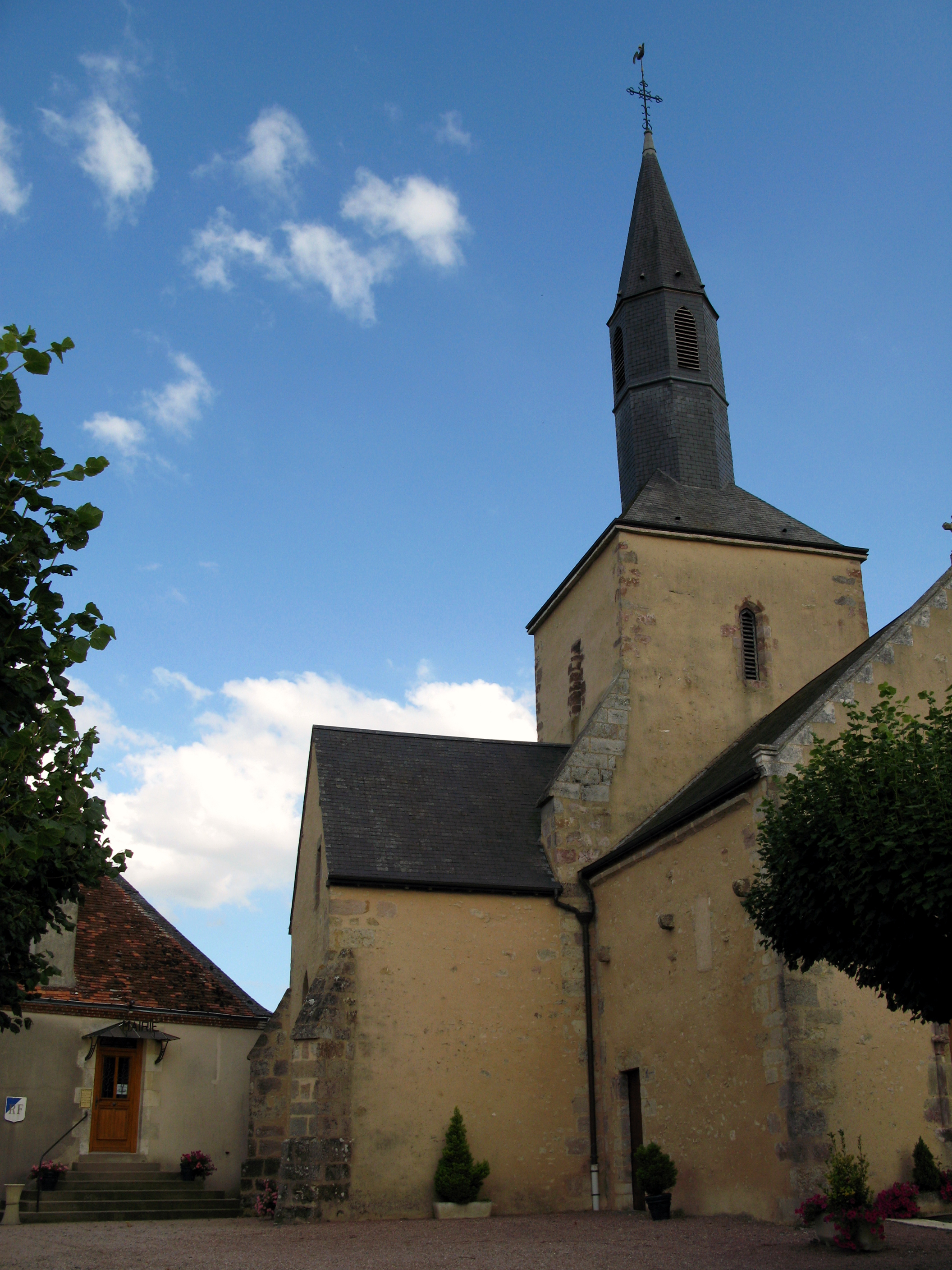
- The church and the town hall in Mouhers
- Location of Mouhers
- Location within France Location within Centre-Val de Loire
- Coordinates: 46°33′57″N 1°46′42″E
- Country: France
- Region: Centre-Val de Loire
- Department: Indre
- Arrondissement: La Châtre
- Canton: Neuvy-Saint-Sépulchre

Government
  - Mayor (2020–2026): Barbara Nicolas
- Area^{1}: 17.89 km^{2} (6.91 sq mi)
- Elevation: 250 m (820 ft)
- Highest elevation: 293 m (961 ft)
- Lowest elevation: 190 m (620 ft)
- Population (2023): 201
  - Density: 11.2/km^{2} (29.1/sq mi)
- Time zone: UTC+01:00 (CET)
  - Summer (DST): UTC+02:00 (CEST)
- INSEE/Postal code: 36133 /36340
- ^{1} French Land Register data, which excludes lakes, ponds, glaciers > 1 km^{2} (0.386 sq mi or 247 acres) and river estuaries.

Mouhers is a commune in the Indre department in central France.

== Geography ==
The Bouzanne forms the commune's southwestern border, then flows northeast through the western part of the commune.

== Population ==
Historical population
Year	Pop.	±% p.a.
1968	370	—
1975	342	−1.12%
1982	301	−1.81%
1990	269	−1.40%
1999	250	−0.81%
2007	243	−0.35%
2012	244	+0.08%
2017	229	−1.26%
2023	201	−2.15%
Source: INSEE

== See also ==
- Communes of the Indre department
