= Lourdoueix-Saint-Michel =

- Commune
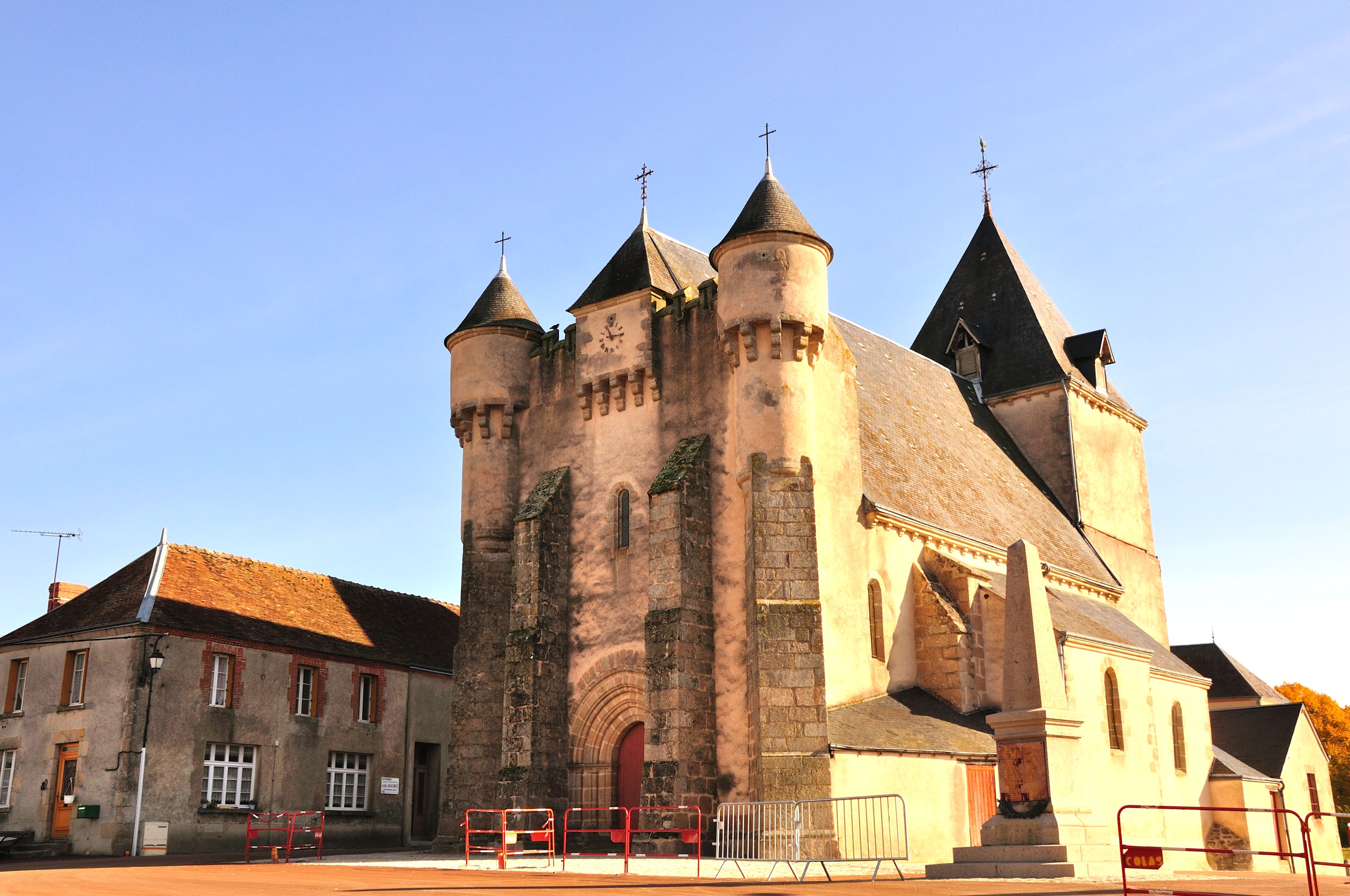
- The church in Lourdoueix-St-Michel
- Location of Lourdoueix-Saint-Michel
- Location within France Location within Centre-Val de Loire
- Coordinates: 46°25′39″N 1°43′51″E
- Country: France
- Region: Centre-Val de Loire
- Department: Indre
- Arrondissement: La Châtre
- Canton: Neuvy-Saint-Sépulchre

Government
  - Mayor (2022–2026): Christine Sauvard
- Area^{1}: 19.67 km^{2} (7.59 sq mi)
- Elevation: 360 m (1,180 ft)
- Highest elevation: 382 m (1,253 ft)
- Lowest elevation: 245 m (804 ft)
- Population (2023): 295
  - Density: 15.0/km^{2} (38.8/sq mi)
- Time zone: UTC+01:00 (CET)
  - Summer (DST): UTC+02:00 (CEST)
- INSEE/Postal code: 36099 /36140
- ^{1} French Land Register data, which excludes lakes, ponds, glaciers > 1 km^{2} (0.386 sq mi or 247 acres) and river estuaries.

Lourdoueix-Saint-Michel (French pronunciation: [luʁdwɛ sɛ̃ miʃɛl]; Occitan: L'Ordoer de Sent Micheu) is a commune in the Indre department in central France.

== Population ==
Historical population
Year	Pop.	±% p.a.
1968	756	—
1975	652	−2.09%
1982	567	−1.98%
1990	503	−1.49%
1999	426	−1.83%
2007	380	−1.42%
2012	339	−2.26%
2017	315	−1.46%
2023	295	−1.09%
Source: INSEE

== See also ==
- Communes of the Indre department
