= Le Magny, Indre =

Le Magny
- Commune
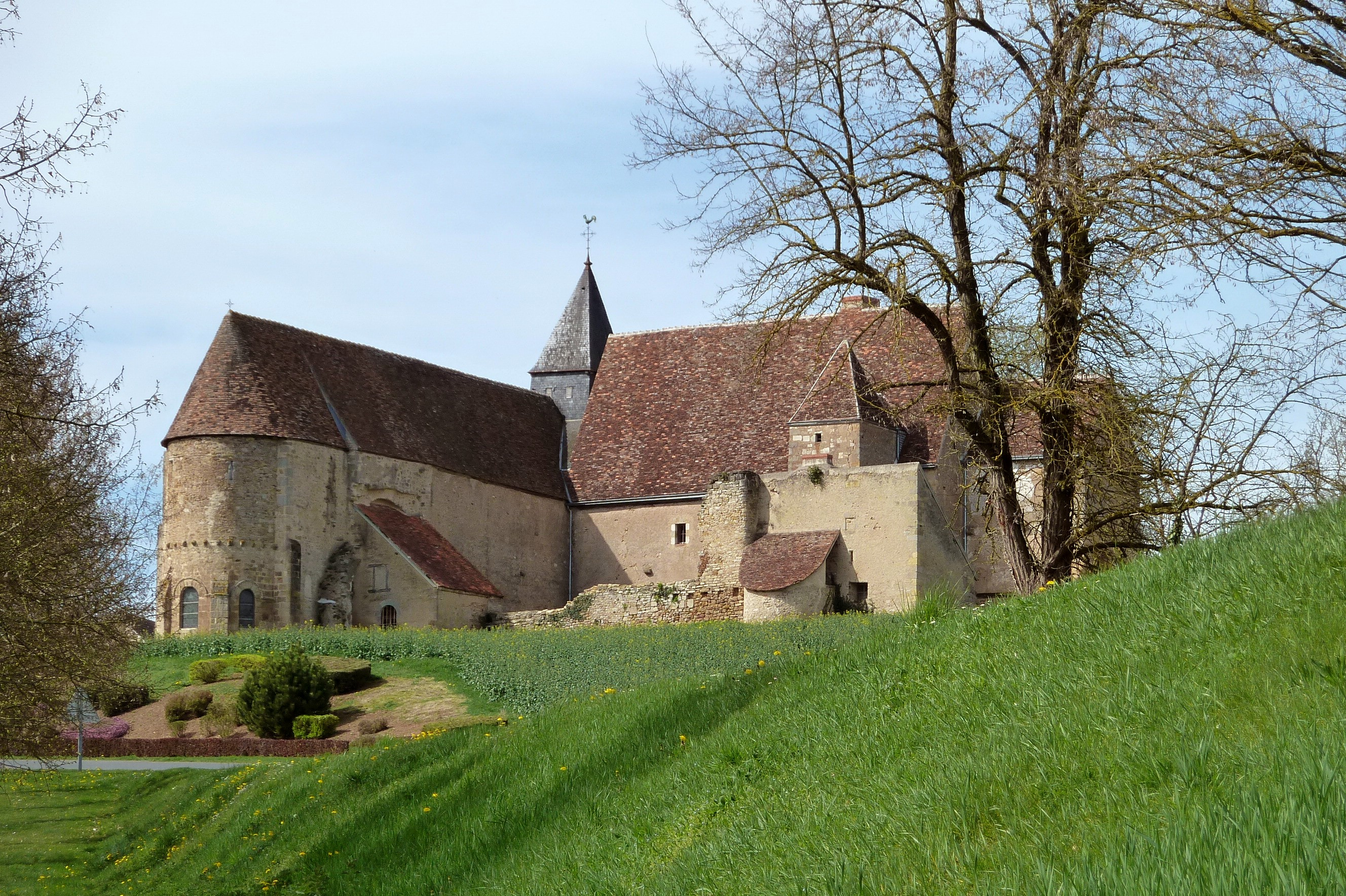
- Priory
- Location of Le Magny
- Location within France Location within Centre-Val de Loire
- Coordinates: 46°34′05″N 1°57′36″E
- Country: France
- Region: Centre-Val de Loire
- Department: Indre
- Arrondissement: La Châtre
- Canton: Neuvy-Saint-Sépulchre
- Intercommunality: La Châtre et Sainte-Sévère

Government
  - Mayor (2020–2026): Gérard Défougère
- Area^{1}: 17.84 km^{2} (6.89 sq mi)
- Elevation: 243 m (797 ft)
- Highest elevation: 294 m (965 ft)
- Lowest elevation: 207 m (679 ft)
- Population (2023): 1,003
  - Density: 56.22/km^{2} (145.6/sq mi)
- Time zone: UTC+01:00 (CET)
  - Summer (DST): UTC+02:00 (CEST)
- INSEE/Postal code: 36109 /36400
- ^{1} French Land Register data, which excludes lakes, ponds, glaciers > 1 km^{2} (0.386 sq mi or 247 acres) and river estuaries.

Le Magny (French pronunciation: [lə maɲi]) is a commune in the Indre department in central France.

== Population ==
Historical population
Year	Pop.	±% p.a.
1968	479	—
1975	565	+2.39%
1982	752	+4.17%
1990	860	+1.69%
1999	858	−0.03%
2007	985	+1.74%
2012	1,056	+1.40%
2017	1,085	+0.54%
2023	1,003	−1.30%
Source: INSEE

== See also ==
- Communes of the Indre department
