= Château de Nadaillac-de-Rouge =

French castle

Coordinates: 44°51′00″N 1°25′47″E

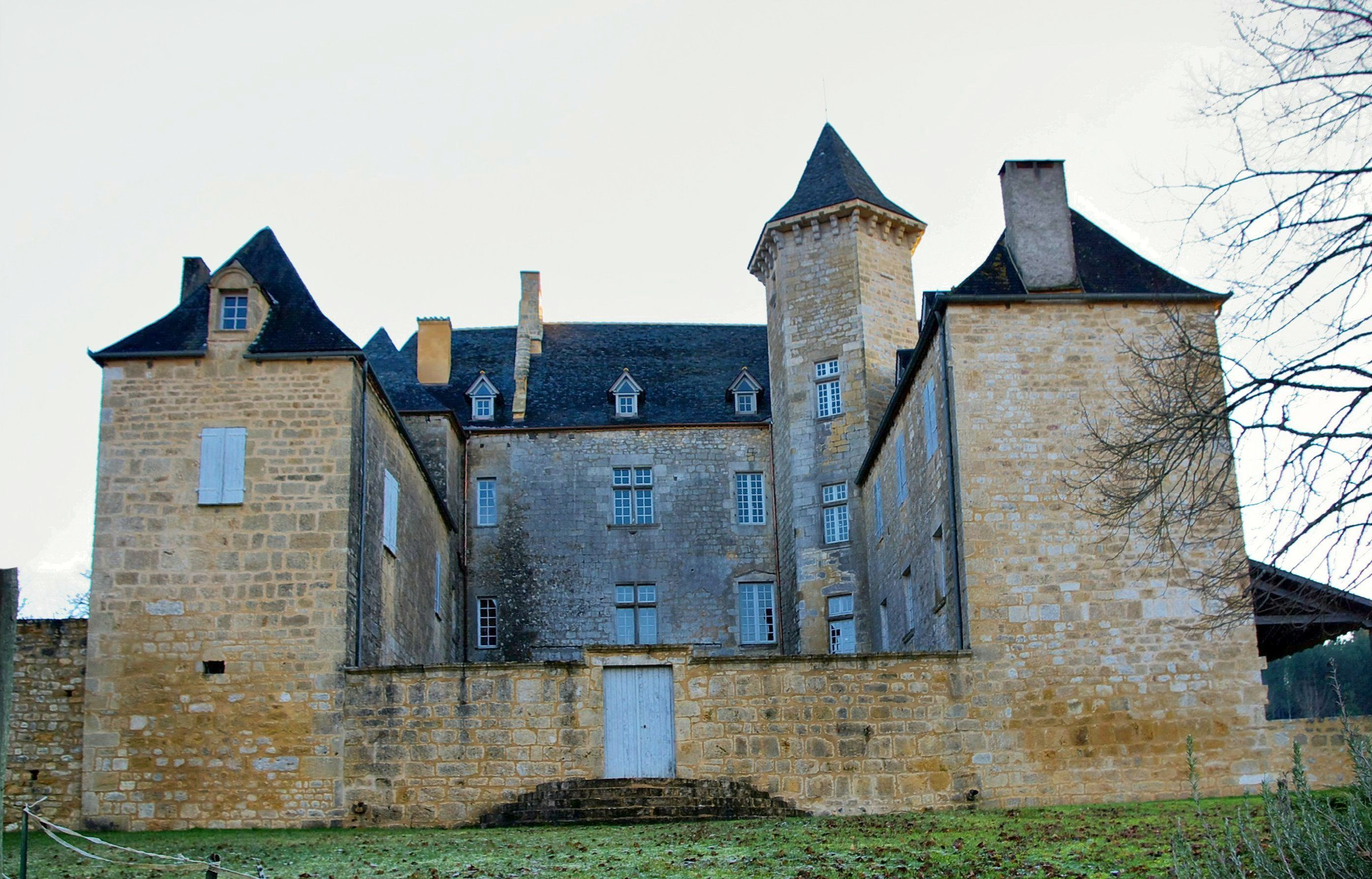

The Château de Nadaillac-de-Rouge is a castle, rebuilt as a Renaissance château, in the commune of Nadaillac-de-Rouge in the Lot département of France.

Construction dates from the 15th, 17th and 18th centuries. The site of Nadaillac is first recorded from the 11th century. The castle seems to have been rebuilt after the Hundred Years' War on its original foundations. The corps de logis was enlarged with the addition of wings during the 17th century. The buildings in the south bear the date 1711. The château was entirely restored between 1968 and 1973.

It is a hereditary property of the Marquises de Nadaillac, whose other properties have included Château de Lalande. The Château de Nadaillac-de-Rouge is privately owned. It has been listed since 1999 as a monument historique by the French Ministry of Culture.

== See also ==
- List of castles in France
