= Crevant =

- Commune
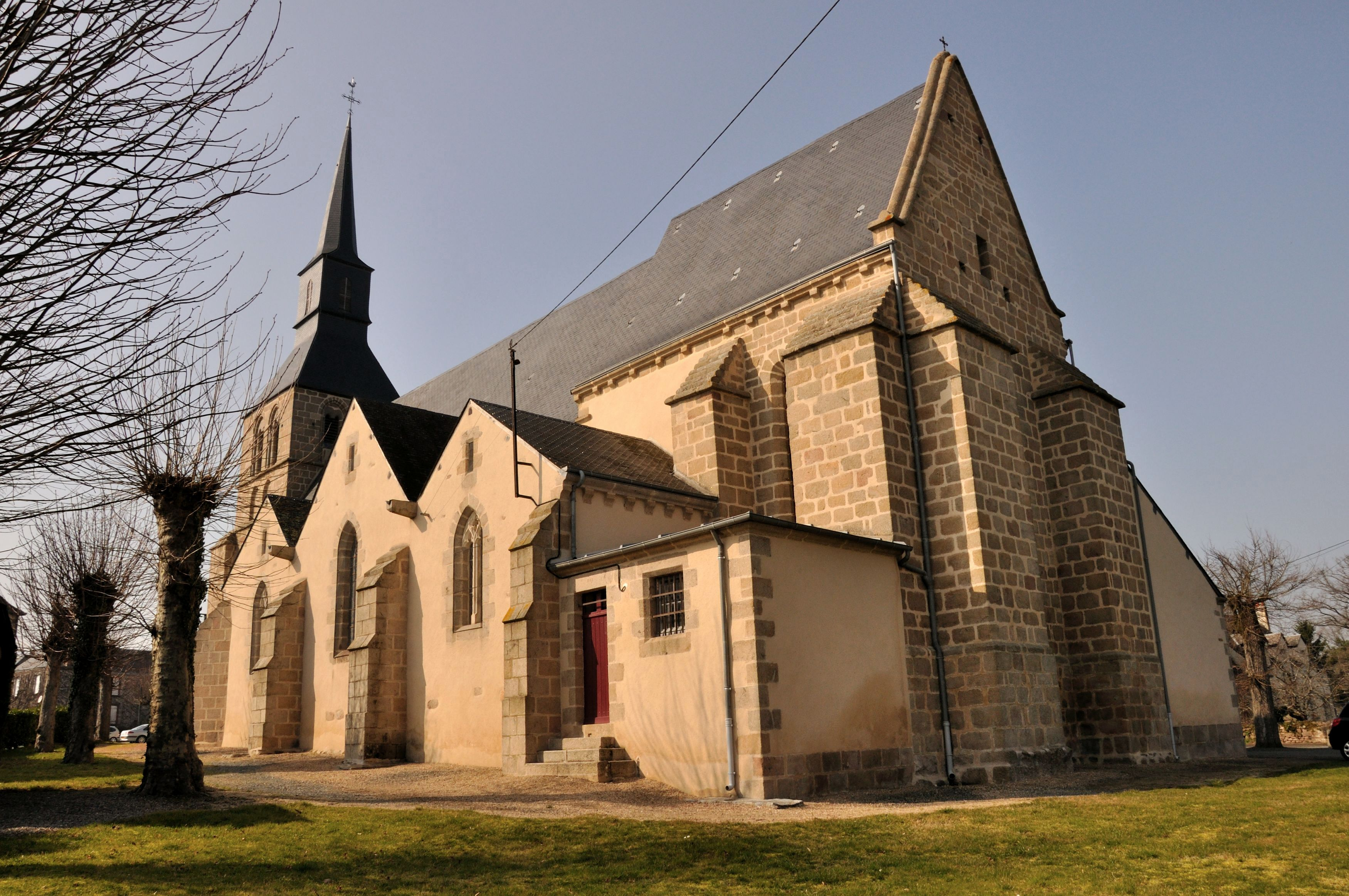
- The Church of Saint-Aubin, in Crevant
- Location of Crevant
- Location within France Location within Centre-Val de Loire
- Coordinates: 46°29′14″N 1°56′51″E
- Country: France
- Region: Centre-Val de Loire
- Department: Indre
- Arrondissement: La Châtre
- Canton: Neuvy-Saint-Sépulchre

Government
  - Mayor (2020–2026): Daniel Daudon
- Area^{1}: 36.54 km^{2} (14.11 sq mi)
- Elevation: 369 m (1,211 ft)
- Highest elevation: 467 m (1,532 ft)
- Lowest elevation: 272 m (892 ft)
- Population (2023): 705
  - Density: 19.3/km^{2} (50.0/sq mi)
- Time zone: UTC+01:00 (CET)
  - Summer (DST): UTC+02:00 (CEST)
- INSEE/Postal code: 36060 /36140
- ^{1} French Land Register data, which excludes lakes, ponds, glaciers > 1 km^{2} (0.386 sq mi or 247 acres) and river estuaries.

Crevant (French pronunciation: [kʁəvɑ̃]) is a commune in the Indre department in central France.

== Population ==
Historical population
| Year | Pop. | ±% p.a. |
|---|---|---|
| 1968 | 1,112 | — |
| 1975 | 905 | −2.90% |
| 1982 | 832 | −1.19% |
| 1990 | 757 | −1.17% |
| 1999 | 713 | −0.66% |
| 2007 | 722 | +0.16% |
| 2012 | 728 | +0.17% |
| 2017 | 718 | −0.28% |
| 2023 | 705 | −0.30% |
Source: INSEE

== See also ==
- Communes of the Indre department
