= Bouzanne =

River in France

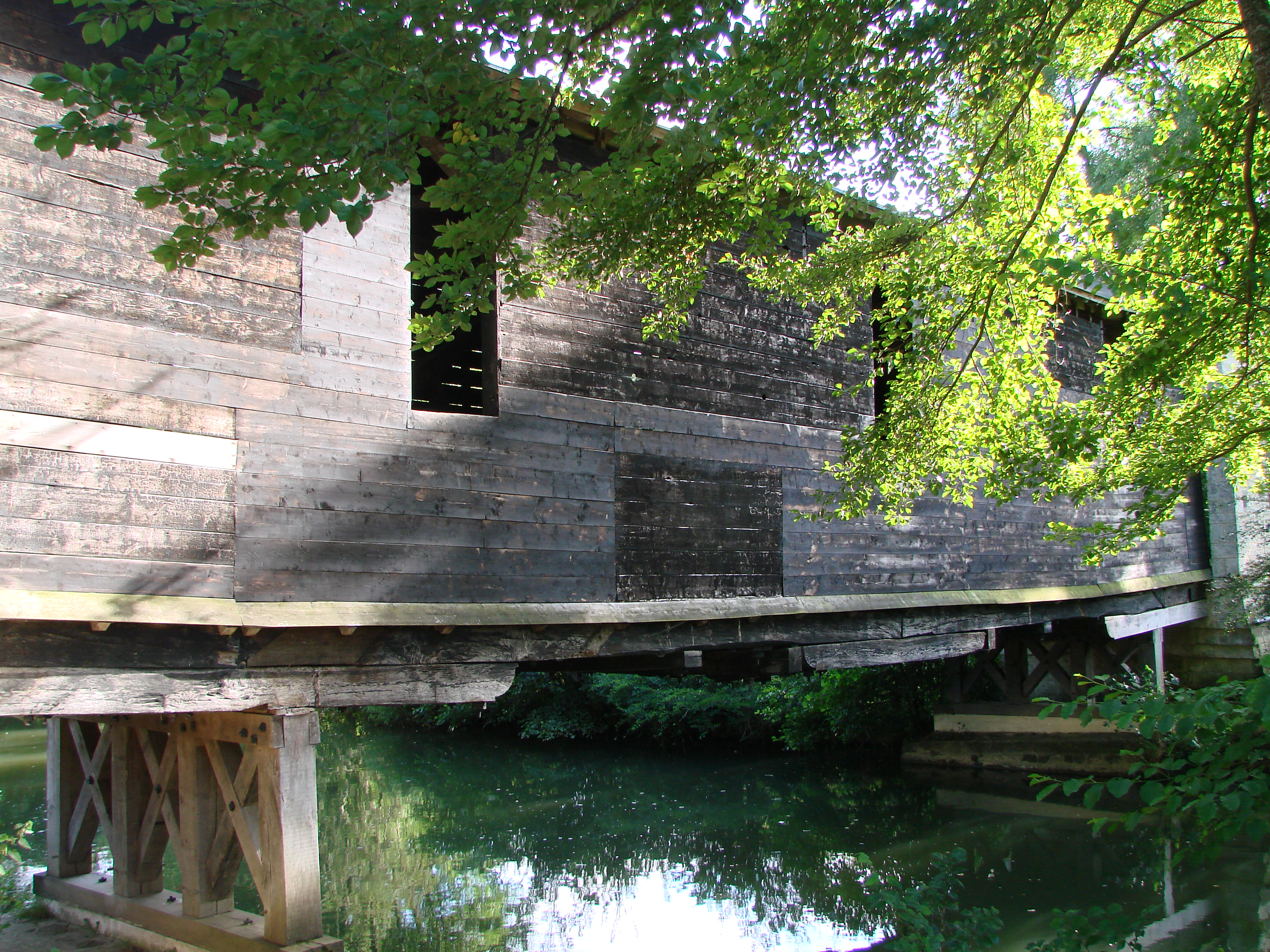
- wooden covered bridge over the Bouzanne at Le Pont-Chrétien-Chabenet

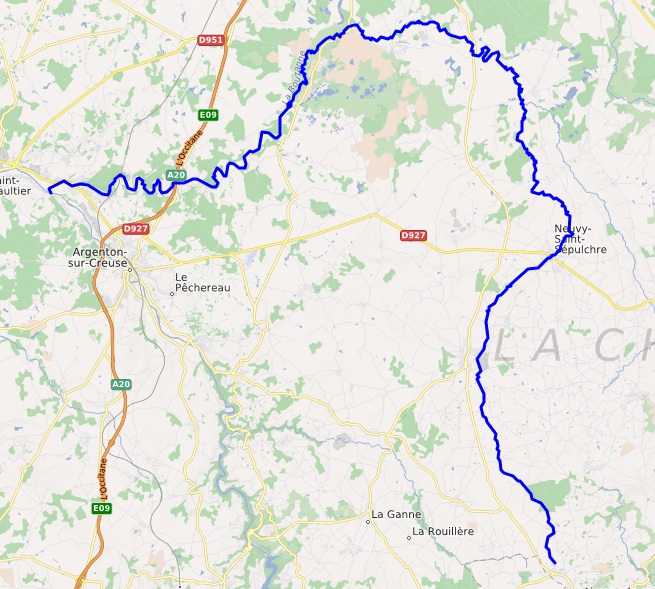

Location
- Country: France

Physical characteristics
- Source
  - location: in Aigurande
  - coordinates: 46°27′06″N 01°48′34″E
  - elevation: 385 m (1,263 ft)
- Mouth
  - location: Creuse
  - coordinates: 46°37′33″N 01°27′51″E
  - elevation: 95 m (312 ft)
- Length: 84.2 km (52.3 mi)
- Basin size: 596 km^{2} (230 sq mi)
- Discharge
  - average: 3.23 m^{3}/s (114 cu ft/s)

Basin features
- Progression: Creuse→ Vienne→ Loire→ Atlantic Ocean

The Bouzanne (French pronunciation: [buzan]) is an 84.2 kilometres (52.3 mi) long river in the Indre département of central France, and is a tributary of the Creuse. Its source is in the commune of Aigurande, 2.5 kilometres (1.6 mi) northwest of the town itself, near the hamlet of la Bouzanne. It flows generally northwest, going northwards from its source up to Arthon, then southwest to the confluence where it enters the Creuse at the right-hand side of the flow (with forwards being downstream), 1.3 kilometres (0.81 mi) southwest of the village centre of Le Pont-Chrétien-Chabenet.

== Communes along its course ==
The following list is ordered from source to mouth : Aigurande, La Buxerette, Montchevrier, Cluis, Mouhers, Neuvy-Saint-Sépulchre, Tranzault, Lys-Saint-Georges, Buxières-d'Aillac, Jeu-les-Bois, Arthon, Velles, Tendu, Mosnay, Saint-Marcel, Chasseneuil, Le Pont-Chrétien-Chabenet
