= Cluis =

- Commune
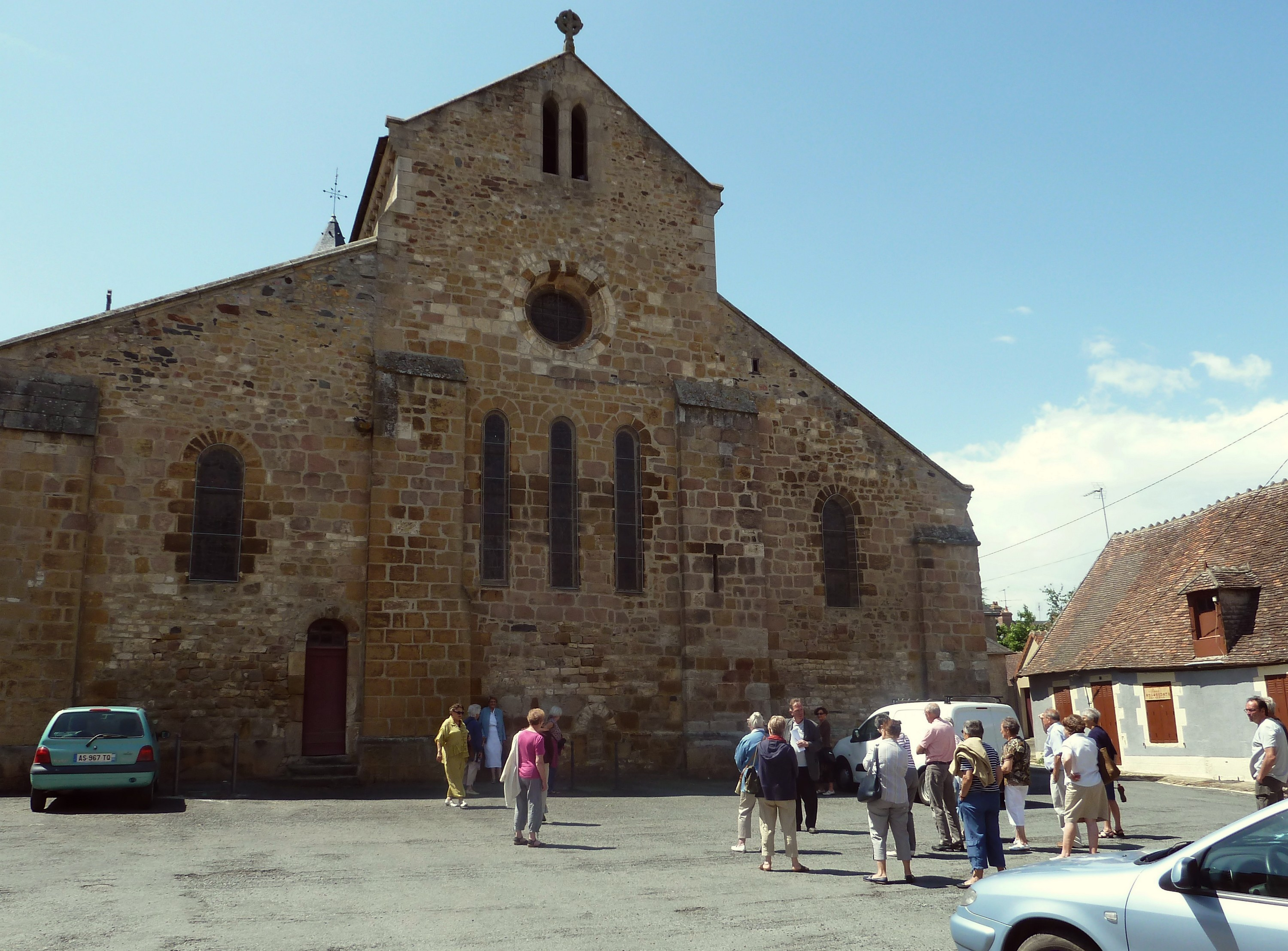
- The church of Saint-Paxent, in Cluis

- Coat of arms
- Location of Cluis
- Location within France Location within Centre-Val de Loire
- Coordinates: 46°32′45″N 1°44′57″E
- Country: France
- Region: Centre-Val de Loire
- Department: Indre
- Arrondissement: La Châtre
- Canton: Neuvy-Saint-Sépulchre

Government
  - Mayor (2021–2026): Didier Fleury
- Area^{1}: 35.32 km^{2} (13.64 sq mi)
- Elevation: 283 m (928 ft)
- Highest elevation: 340 m (1,120 ft)
- Lowest elevation: 188 m (617 ft)
- Population (2023): 969
  - Density: 27.4/km^{2} (71.1/sq mi)
- Time zone: UTC+01:00 (CET)
  - Summer (DST): UTC+02:00 (CEST)
- INSEE/Postal code: 36056 /36340
- ^{1} French Land Register data, which excludes lakes, ponds, glaciers > 1 km^{2} (0.386 sq mi or 247 acres) and river estuaries.

Cluis (French pronunciation: [klɥi]) is a commune in the Indre department of the Centre-Val de Loire region of central France.

== Geography ==
The commune is traversed by the river Bouzanne.

== Population ==
Historical population
Year	Pop.	±% p.a.
1968	1,516	—
1975	1,448	−0.65%
1982	1,311	−1.41%
1990	1,196	−1.14%
1999	1,063	−1.30%
2007	1,035	−0.33%
2012	1,006	−0.57%
2017	996	−0.20%
2023	969	−0.46%
Source: INSEE

== See also ==
- Communes of the Indre department
