= Velles, Indre =

Velles
- Commune
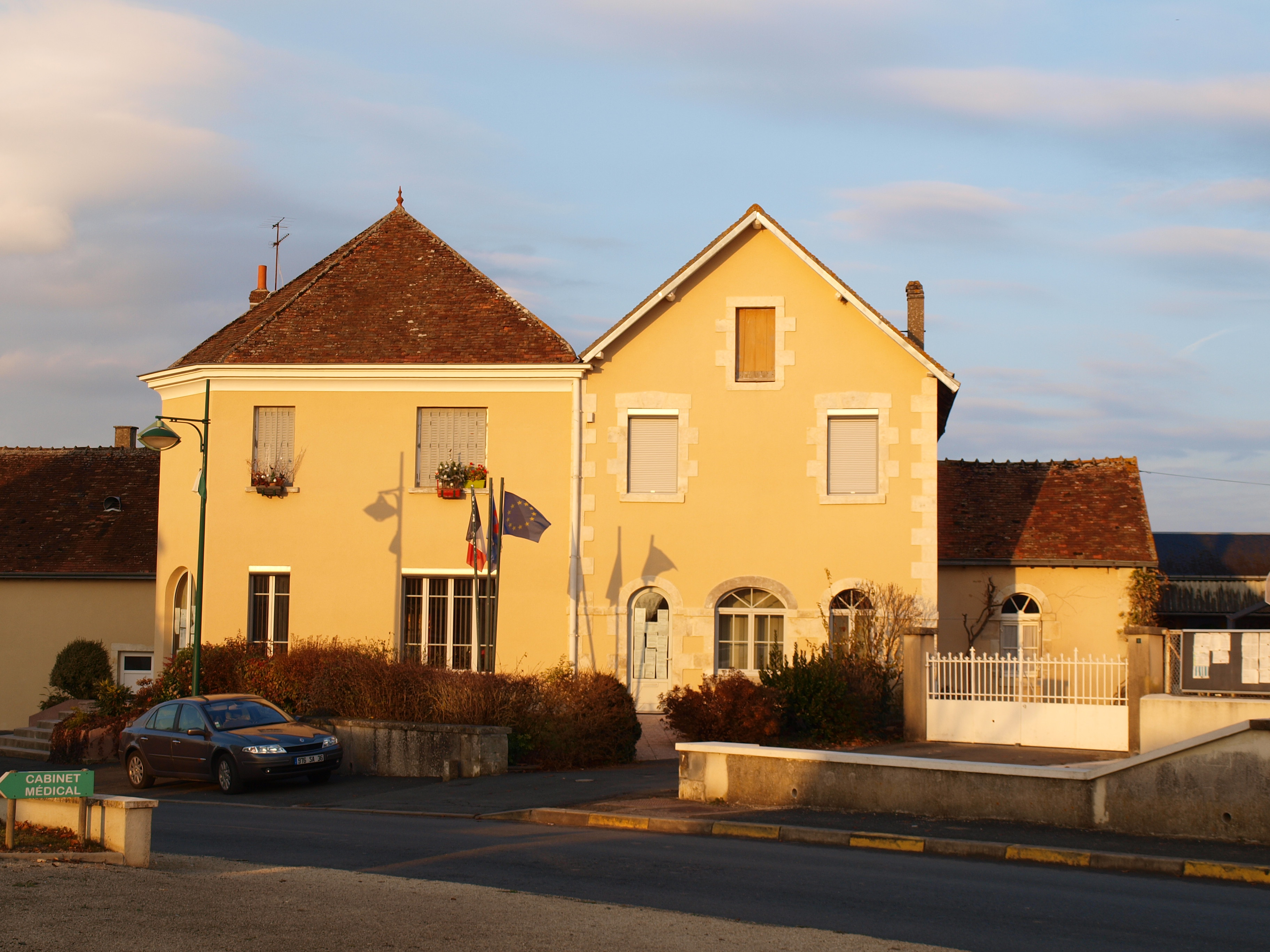
- The town hall in Velles
- Location of Velles
- Location within France Location within Centre-Val de Loire
- Coordinates: 46°41′20″N 1°39′01″E
- Country: France
- Region: Centre-Val de Loire
- Department: Indre
- Arrondissement: Châteauroux
- Canton: Argenton-sur-Creuse
- Intercommunality: Éguzon-Argenton-Vallée de la Creuse

Government
  - Mayor (2020–2026): Pascal Chambeau
- Area^{1}: 63.09 km^{2} (24.36 sq mi)
- Elevation: 150 m (490 ft)
- Highest elevation: 184 m (604 ft)
- Lowest elevation: 117 m (384 ft)
- Population (2023): 975
  - Density: 15.5/km^{2} (40.0/sq mi)
- Time zone: UTC+01:00 (CET)
  - Summer (DST): UTC+02:00 (CEST)
- INSEE/Postal code: 36231 /36330
- ^{1} French Land Register data, which excludes lakes, ponds, glaciers > 1 km^{2} (0.386 sq mi or 247 acres) and river estuaries.

Velles (French pronunciation: [vɛl]) is a commune in the Indre department in central France.

== Geography ==
The commune is traversed by the river Bouzanne.

== Population ==
Historical population
Year	Pop.	±% p.a.
1968	668	—
1975	716	+1.00%
1982	771	+1.06%
1990	835	+1.00%
1999	827	−0.11%
2007	852	+0.37%
2012	977	+2.78%
2017	985	+0.16%
2023	975	−0.17%
Source: INSEE

== See also ==
- Communes of the Indre department
