= Château de Lalande (Indre) =

Château in Centre-Val de Loire, France

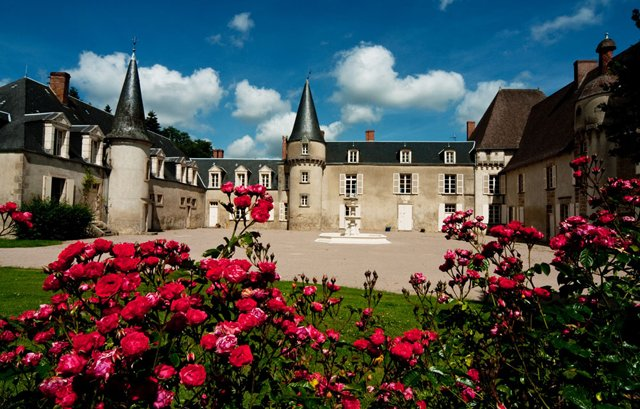

- Location within France
- Alternative names: Château de la Lande

General information
- Status: Bed and breakfast, private residence
- Location: Route de la Lande, 36140 Crozon-sur-Vauvre, France
- Coordinates: 46°28′12″N 1°53′42″E
- Year built: 16th century

Other information
- Number of rooms: 40

Website
- www.chateaudelalande.com

Château de Lalande (also written de la Lande) is a 16th-century château near Crozon-sur-Vauvre, a commune in the Indre department in the Centre-Val de Loire region of France. Historically part of the province of Berry until 1790, it now functions as both a bed and breakfast and a private residence.

== History ==
Arms of the Pouget de Nadaillac family

The current château was built in the 16th century, by the side of a lake. The east wing with its huge square towers, defences and semi-circular tower, dates from this period.

The château was once owned by Anne Marie Louise d'Orléans, Duchess of Montpensier, a cousin of Louis XIV known as "La Grande Mademoiselle".

Following a fire in the 1860s, a wing of the château was rebuilt and two circular towers were added to the building.

The château has a separate private chapel dedicated to Saint Joseph, built in 1865.

In the mid-19th century, it was visited by the French novelist George Sand, who described the area as "la vallée noire" (the black valley).

It later became the hereditary property of the Marquises de Nadaillac. François-Louis du Pouget de Nadaillac escorted Marie Antoinette to France in 1770. The current owners bought Lalande from the de Nadaillac family in 2005.

== Points of interest ==
The "Chêne du Not", a historic and large oak tree, is located near the château.

== In popular culture ==
Lalande is featured in the UK reality television series Escape to the Chateau: DIY on Channel 4 and the French television series Bienvenue chez nous ("Welcome to our house") on TF1. Lalande is the subject of the YouTube series The Chateau Diaries.

== See also ==
- Château de Nadaillac-de-Rouge
