= Canton of Neuvy-Saint-Sépulchre =

Coordinates: 46.60°N 1.81°E

The canton of Neuvy-Saint-Sépulchre is an administrative division of the Indre department, central France. Its borders were modified at the French canton reorganisation which came into effect in March 2015. Its seat is in Neuvy-Saint-Sépulchre.

It consists of the following communes:

1. Aigurande
2. La Buxerette
3. Buxières-d'Aillac
4. Chassignolles
5. Cluis
6. Crevant
7. Crozon-sur-Vauvre
8. Fougerolles
9. Gournay
10. Lourdoueix-Saint-Michel
11. Lys-Saint-Georges
12. Le Magny
13. Maillet
14. Malicornay
15. Mers-sur-Indre
16. Montchevrier
17. Montgivray
18. Montipouret
19. Mouhers
20. Neuvy-Saint-Sépulchre
21. Orsennes
22. Saint-Denis-de-Jouhet
23. Saint-Plantaire
24. Sarzay
25. Tranzault
