= Gournay, Indre =

Gournay
- Commune
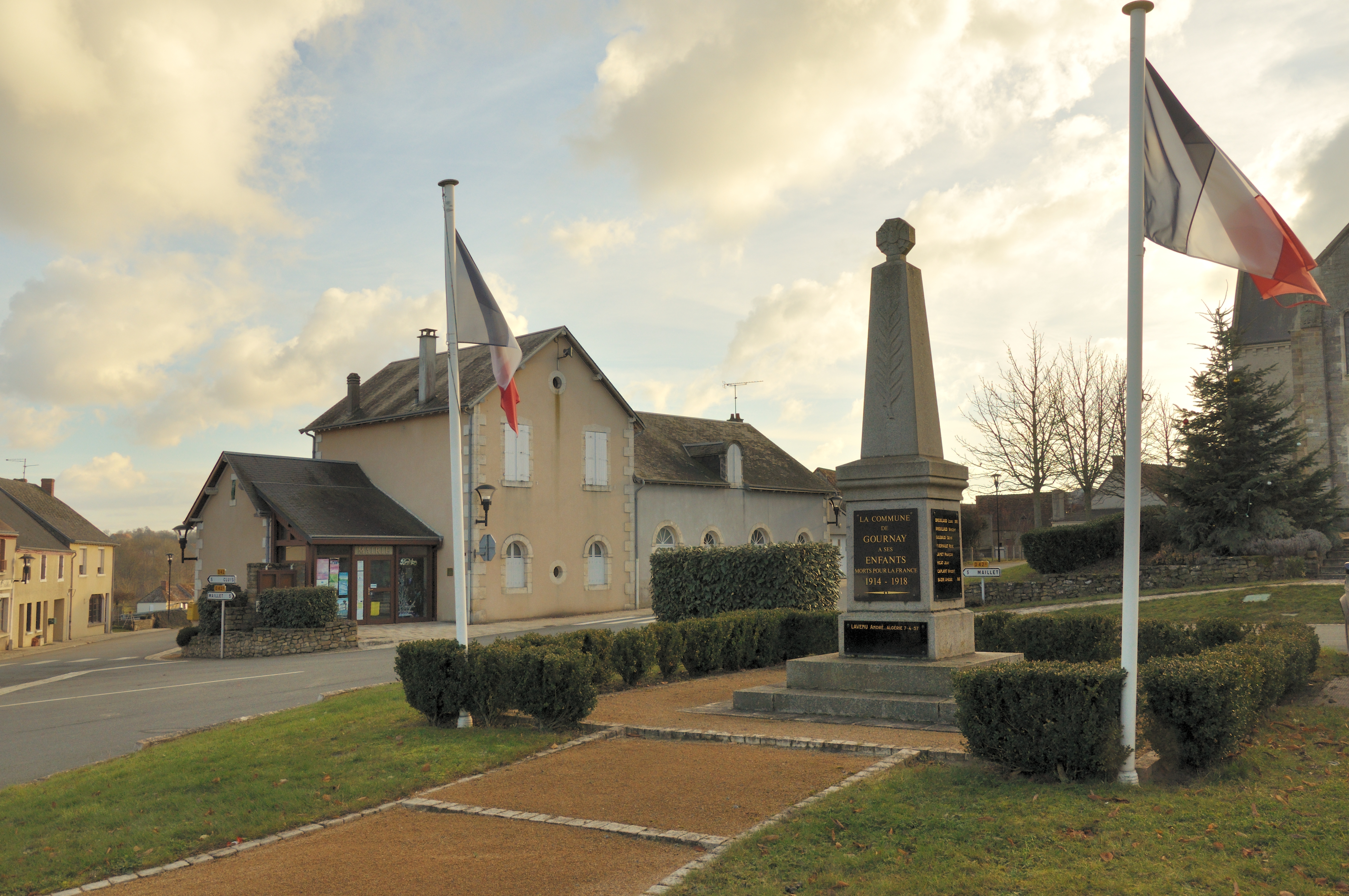
- War memorial
- Location of Gournay
- Location within France Location within Centre-Val de Loire
- Coordinates: 46°35′02″N 1°43′56″E
- Country: France
- Region: Centre-Val de Loire
- Department: Indre
- Arrondissement: La Châtre
- Canton: Neuvy-Saint-Sépulchre

Government
  - Mayor (2020–2026): Philippe Bazin
- Area^{1}: 20.33 km^{2} (7.85 sq mi)
- Elevation: 210 m (690 ft)
- Highest elevation: 252 m (827 ft)
- Lowest elevation: 171 m (561 ft)
- Population (2023): 278
  - Density: 13.7/km^{2} (35.4/sq mi)
- Time zone: UTC+01:00 (CET)
  - Summer (DST): UTC+02:00 (CEST)
- INSEE/Postal code: 36084 /36230
- ^{1} French Land Register data, which excludes lakes, ponds, glaciers > 1 km^{2} (0.386 sq mi or 247 acres) and river estuaries.

Gournay (French pronunciation: [ɡuʁnɛ]) is a commune in the Indre department in central France.

== Population ==
Historical population
Year	Pop.	±% p.a.
1968	355	—
1975	279	−3.38%
1982	299	+0.99%
1990	289	−0.42%
1999	283	−0.23%
2007	335	+2.13%
2012	317	−1.10%
2017	290	−1.76%
2023	278	−0.70%
Source: INSEE

== See also ==
- Communes of the Indre department
