= Lys-Saint-Georges =

- Commune
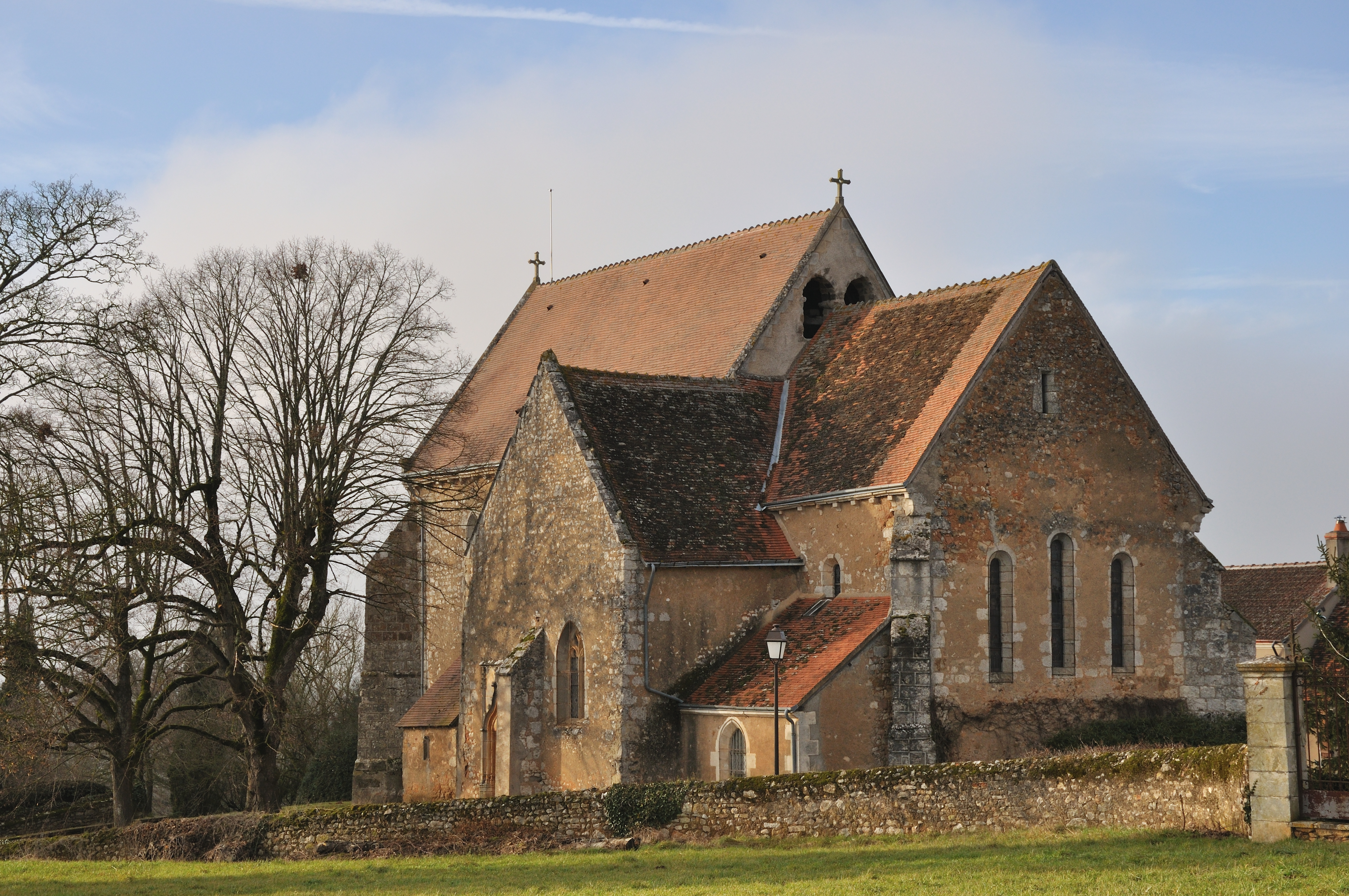
- The Church of Saint-Georges, in Lys-Saint-Georges

- Coat of arms
- Location of Lys-Saint-Georges
- Location within France Location within Centre-Val de Loire
- Coordinates: 46°38′34″N 1°49′27″E
- Country: France
- Region: Centre-Val de Loire
- Department: Indre
- Arrondissement: La Châtre
- Canton: Neuvy-Saint-Sépulchre

Government
  - Mayor (2020–2026): Olivier Michot
- Area^{1}: 12.98 km^{2} (5.01 sq mi)
- Elevation: 220 m (720 ft)
- Highest elevation: 224 m (735 ft)
- Lowest elevation: 156 m (512 ft)
- Population (2023): 198
  - Density: 15.3/km^{2} (39.5/sq mi)
- Time zone: UTC+01:00 (CET)
  - Summer (DST): UTC+02:00 (CEST)
- INSEE/Postal code: 36108 /36230
- ^{1} French Land Register data, which excludes lakes, ponds, glaciers > 1 km^{2} (0.386 sq mi or 247 acres) and river estuaries.

Lys-Saint-Georges (French pronunciation: [lis sɛ̃ ʒɔʁʒ]) is a commune in the Indre department in central France.

== Geography ==
The Bouzanne forms the commune's western border.

== Population ==
Historical population
Year	Pop.	±% p.a.
1968	180	—
1975	161	−1.58%
1982	171	+0.86%
1990	180	+0.64%
1999	213	+1.89%
2007	221	+0.46%
2012	264	+3.62%
2017	221	−3.49%
2023	198	−1.81%
Source: INSEE

== See also ==
- Communes of the Indre department
