= Maillet, Indre =

Maillet
- Commune
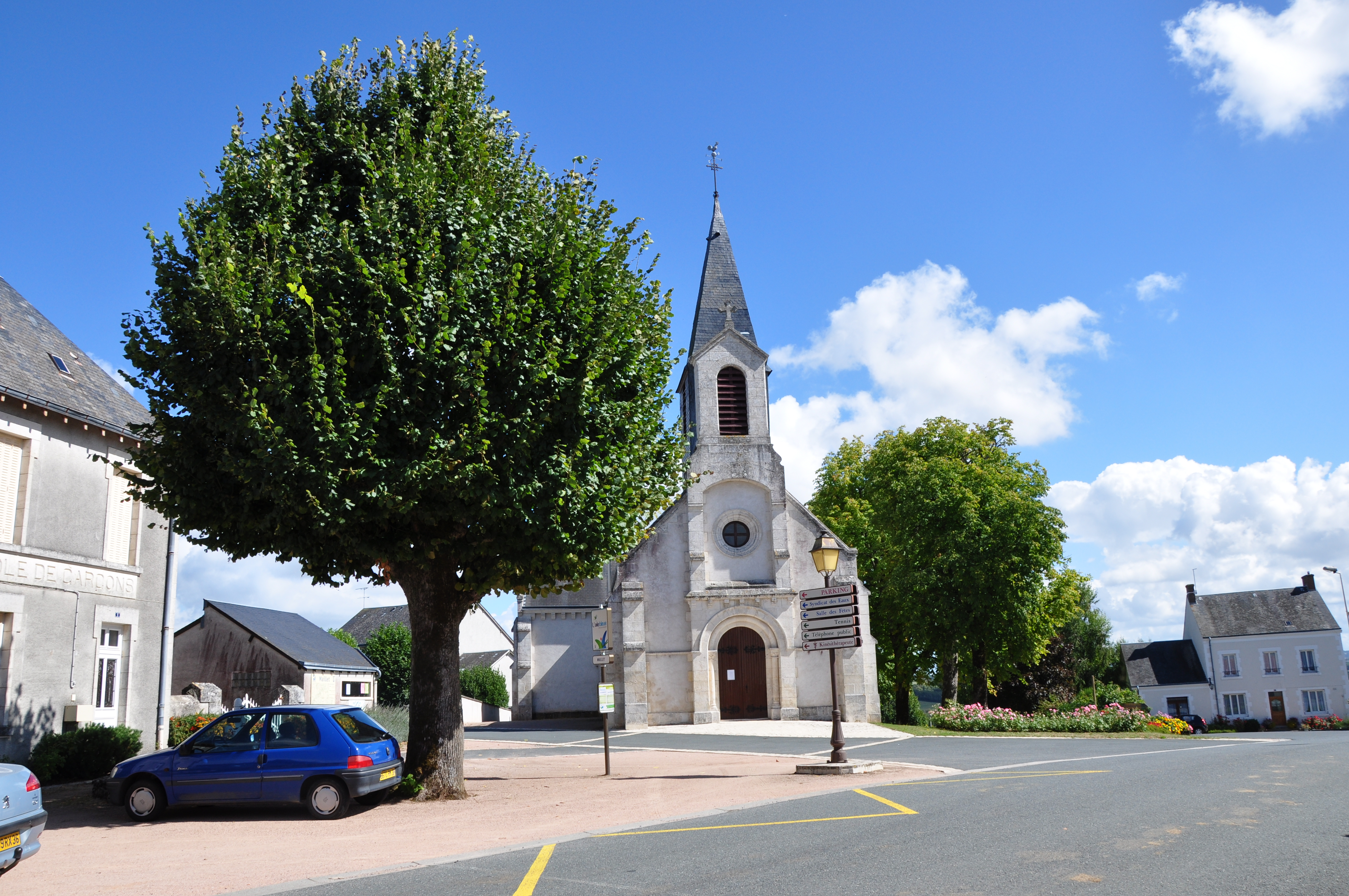
- The church square in Maillet
- Location of Maillet
- Location within France Location within Centre-Val de Loire
- Coordinates: 46°34′27″N 1°40′46″E
- Country: France
- Region: Centre-Val de Loire
- Department: Indre
- Arrondissement: La Châtre
- Canton: Neuvy-Saint-Sépulchre

Government
  - Mayor (2020–2026): Magalie Bouquin
- Area^{1}: 25.02 km^{2} (9.66 sq mi)
- Elevation: 224 m (735 ft)
- Highest elevation: 254 m (833 ft)
- Lowest elevation: 170 m (560 ft)
- Population (2023): 224
  - Density: 8.95/km^{2} (23.2/sq mi)
- Time zone: UTC+01:00 (CET)
  - Summer (DST): UTC+02:00 (CEST)
- INSEE/Postal code: 36110 /36340
- ^{1} French Land Register data, which excludes lakes, ponds, glaciers > 1 km^{2} (0.386 sq mi or 247 acres) and river estuaries.

Maillet (French pronunciation: [majɛ]) is a commune in the Indre department in central France.

== Population ==
Historical population
Year	Pop.	±% p.a.
1968	377	—
1975	331	−1.84%
1982	283	−2.21%
1990	261	−1.01%
1999	248	−0.57%
2007	259	+0.54%
2012	267	+0.61%
2017	263	−0.30%
2023	224	−2.64%
Source: INSEE

== See also ==
- Communes of the Indre department
