= Tranzault =

- Commune
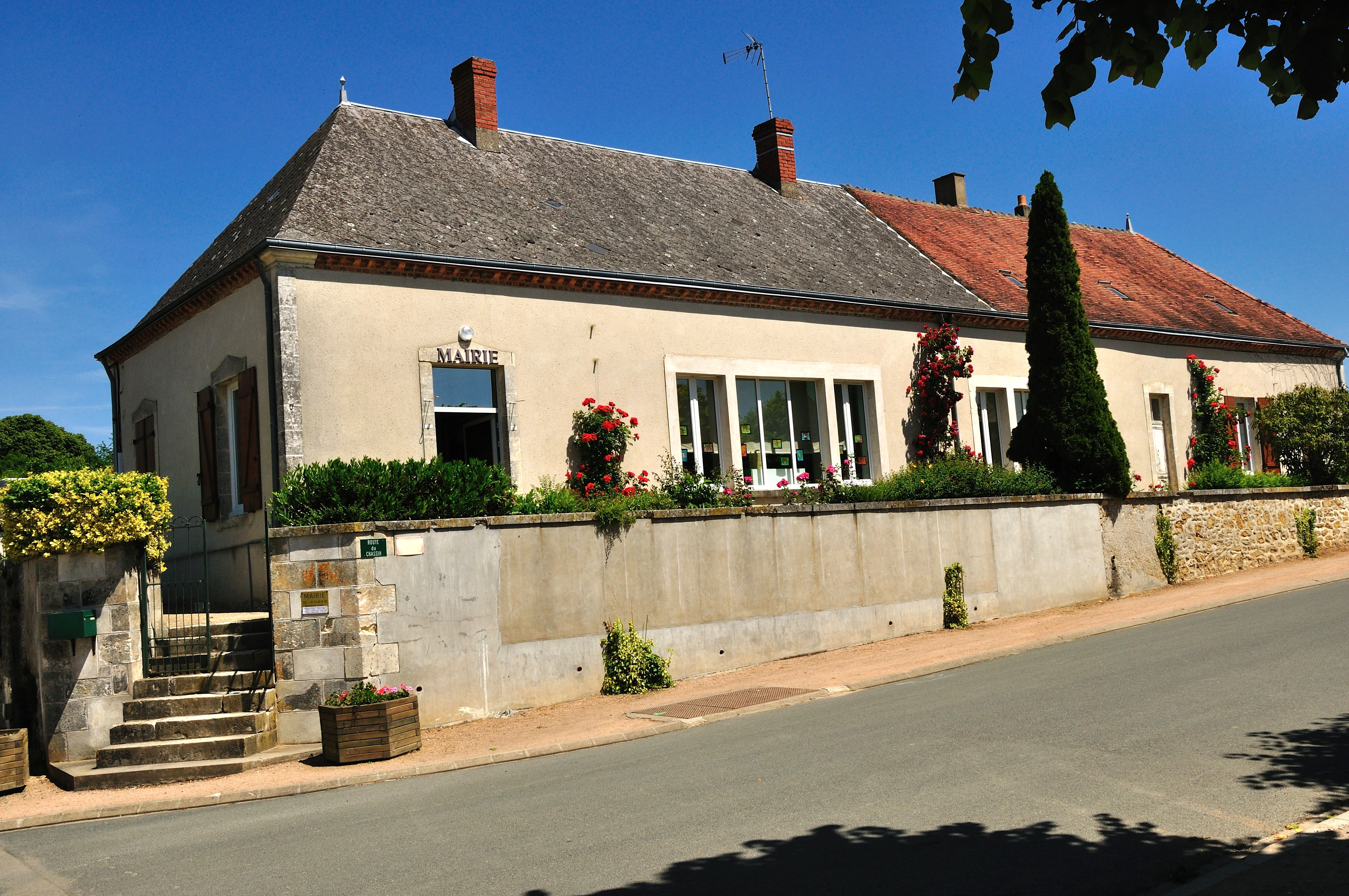
- Town hall
- Location of Tranzault
- Location within France Location within Centre-Val de Loire
- Coordinates: 46°37′54″N 1°51′03″E
- Country: France
- Region: Centre-Val de Loire
- Department: Indre
- Arrondissement: La Châtre
- Canton: Neuvy-Saint-Sépulchre

Government
  - Mayor (2020–2026): Philippe Viaud
- Area^{1}: 17.97 km^{2} (6.94 sq mi)
- Elevation: 228 m (748 ft)
- Highest elevation: 238 m (781 ft)
- Lowest elevation: 166 m (545 ft)
- Population (2023): 349
  - Density: 19.4/km^{2} (50.3/sq mi)
- Time zone: UTC+01:00 (CET)
  - Summer (DST): UTC+02:00 (CEST)
- INSEE/Postal code: 36226 /36230
- ^{1} French Land Register data, which excludes lakes, ponds, glaciers > 1 km^{2} (0.386 sq mi or 247 acres) and river estuaries.

Tranzault (French pronunciation: [tʁɑ̃zo]) is a commune in the Indre department in central France.

== Geography ==
The commune is traversed by the river Bouzanne.

== Population ==
Historical population
Year	Pop.	±% p.a.
1968	364	—
1975	324	−1.65%
1982	318	−0.27%
1990	324	+0.23%
1999	323	−0.03%
2007	322	−0.04%
2012	331	+0.55%
2017	352	+1.24%
2023	349	−0.14%
Source: INSEE

== See also ==
- Communes of the Indre department
