= Mosnay =

- Commune
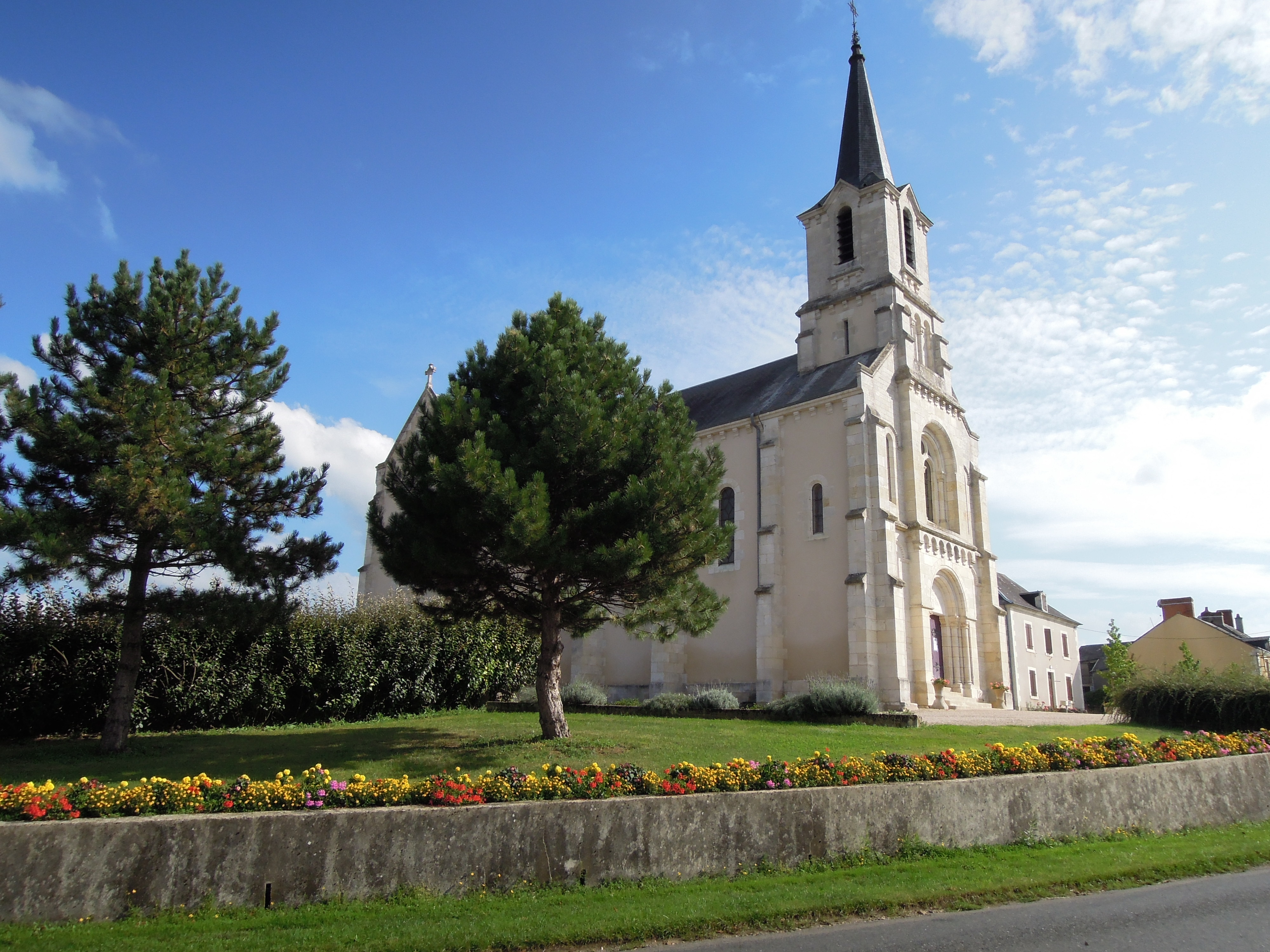
- The church in Mosnay
- Location of Mosnay
- Location within France Location within Centre-Val de Loire
- Coordinates: 46°37′23″N 1°37′50″E
- Country: France
- Region: Centre-Val de Loire
- Department: Indre
- Arrondissement: Châteauroux
- Canton: Argenton-sur-Creuse
- Intercommunality: Éguzon - Argenton - Vallée de la Creuse

Government
  - Mayor (2020–2026): René Delfour
- Area^{1}: 25.28 km^{2} (9.76 sq mi)
- Elevation: 169 m (554 ft)
- Highest elevation: 227 m (745 ft)
- Lowest elevation: 116 m (381 ft)
- Population (2023): 459
  - Density: 18.2/km^{2} (47.0/sq mi)
- Time zone: UTC+01:00 (CET)
  - Summer (DST): UTC+02:00 (CEST)
- INSEE/Postal code: 36131 /36200
- ^{1} French Land Register data, which excludes lakes, ponds, glaciers > 1 km^{2} (0.386 sq mi or 247 acres) and river estuaries.

Mosnay (French pronunciation: [monɛ]) is a commune in the Indre department in central France.

== Geography ==
The Bouzanne forms part of the commune's northwestern border.

== Population ==
Historical population
Year	Pop.	±% p.a.
1968	435	—
1975	416	−0.64%
1982	429	+0.44%
1990	443	+0.40%
1999	439	−0.10%
2007	464	+0.69%
2012	482	+0.76%
2017	474	−0.33%
2023	459	−0.53%
Source: INSEE

== See also ==
- Communes of the Indre department
