= Saint-Marcel, Indre =

Saint-Marcel
- Commune
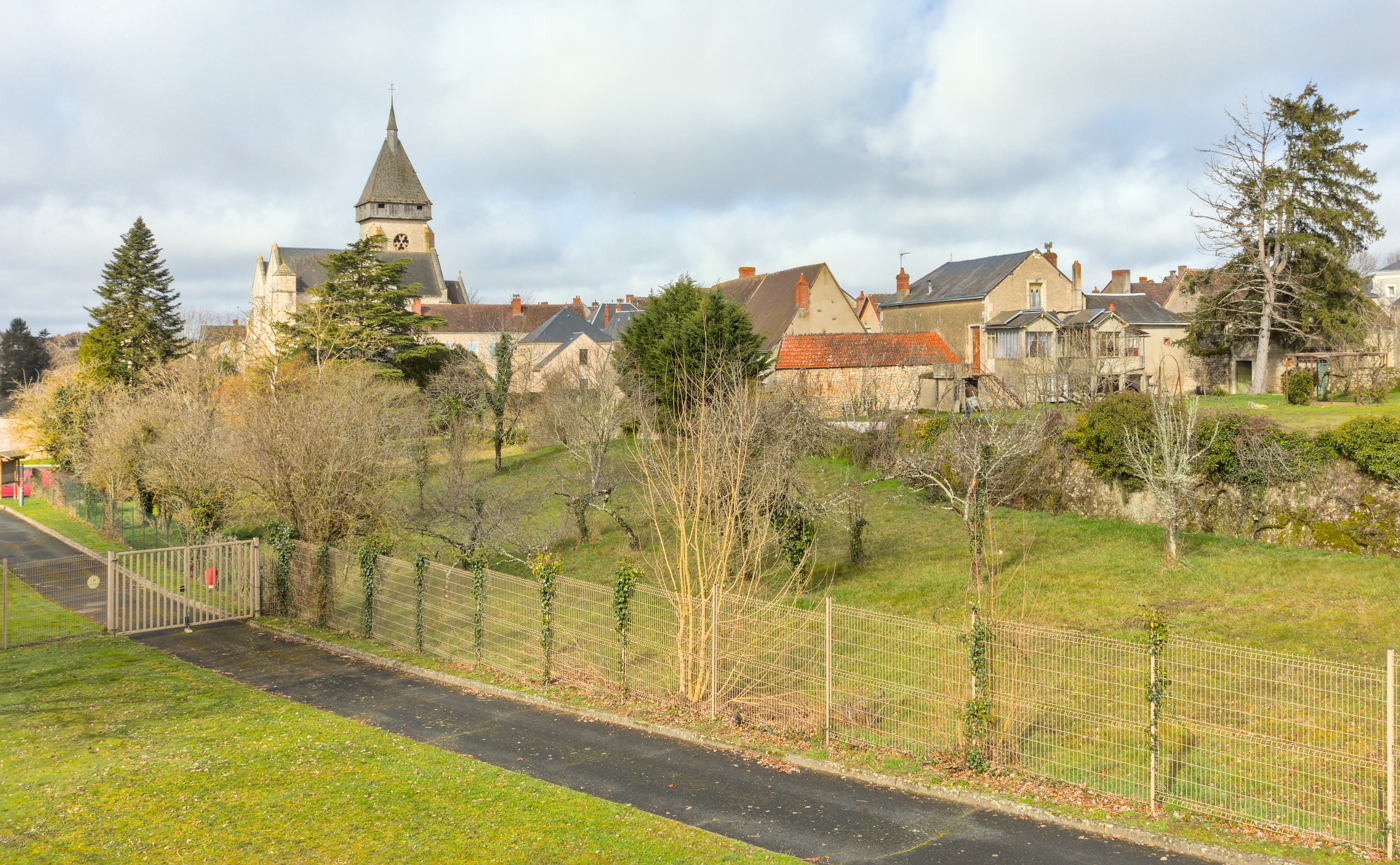
- A view of Saint-Marcel from the Argentomagus museum.
- Location of Saint-Marcel
- Location within France Location within Centre-Val de Loire
- Coordinates: 46°36′10″N 1°30′52″E
- Country: France
- Region: Centre-Val de Loire
- Department: Indre
- Arrondissement: Châteauroux
- Canton: Argenton-sur-Creuse
- Intercommunality: Éguzon-Argenton-Vallée de la Creuse

Government
  - Mayor (2020–2026): Jean-Paul Martin
- Area^{1}: 17.84 km^{2} (6.89 sq mi)
- Elevation: 145 m (476 ft)
- Highest elevation: 178 m (584 ft)
- Lowest elevation: 98 m (322 ft)
- Population (2023): 1,514
  - Density: 84.87/km^{2} (219.8/sq mi)
- Time zone: UTC+01:00 (CET)
  - Summer (DST): UTC+02:00 (CEST)
- INSEE/Postal code: 36200 /36200
- ^{1} French Land Register data, which excludes lakes, ponds, glaciers > 1 km^{2} (0.386 sq mi or 247 acres) and river estuaries.

Saint-Marcel (French pronunciation: [sɛ̃ maʁsɛl]) is a commune in the Indre department in central France.

== Geography ==
The commune is traversed by the river Bouzanne.

== Population ==
Historical population
Year	Pop.	±% p.a.
1968	1,668	—
1975	1,591	−0.67%
1982	1,683	+0.81%
1990	1,687	+0.03%
1999	1,641	−0.31%
2007	1,638	−0.02%
2012	1,572	−0.82%
2017	1,585	+0.16%
2023	1,514	−0.76%
Source: INSEE

== See also ==
- Communes of the Indre department
