= Le Pont-Chrétien-Chabenet =

- Commune
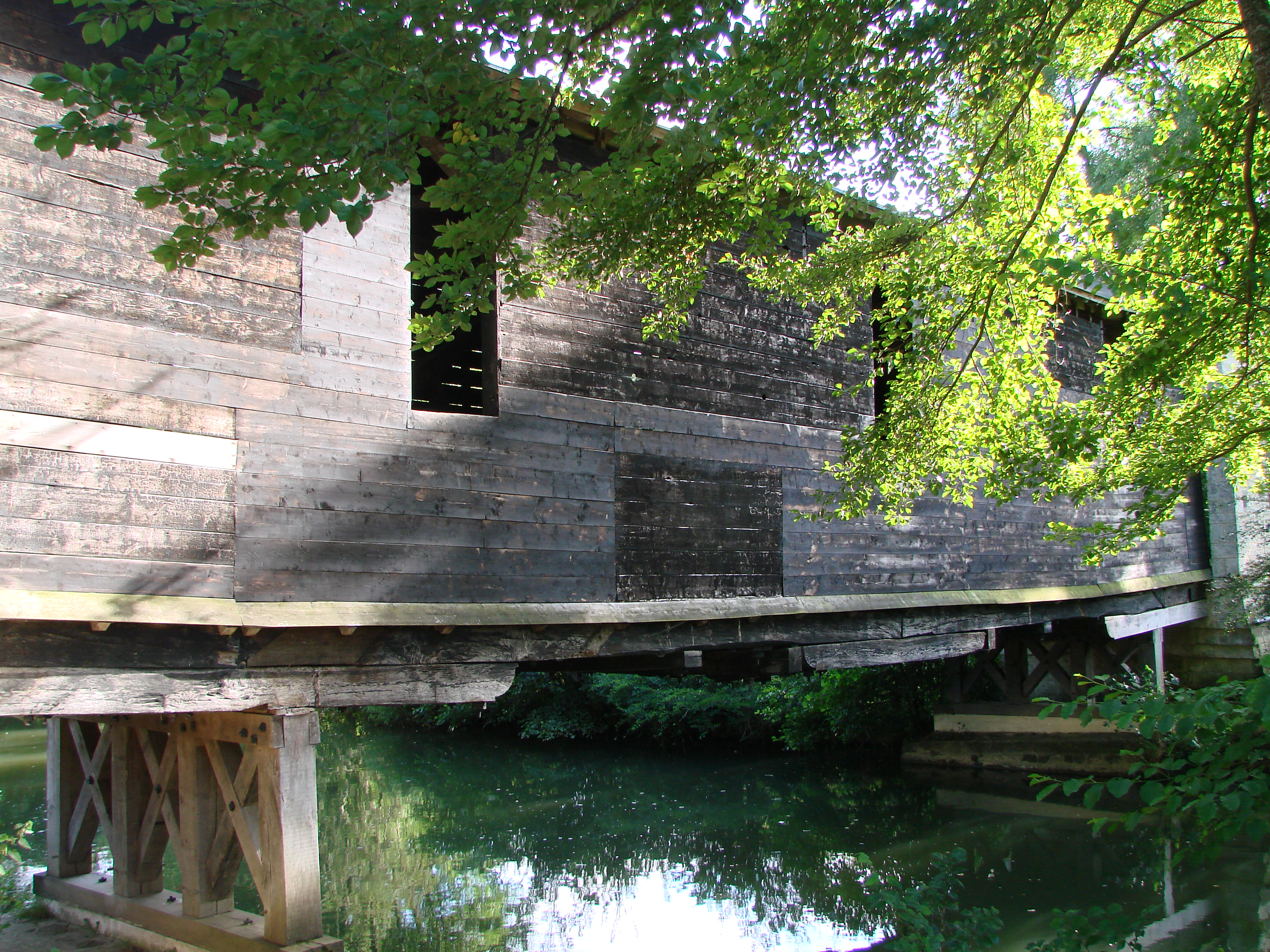
- Oldest wooden covered bridge in France

- Coat of arms
- Location of Le Pont-Chrétien-Chabenet
- Location within France Location within Centre-Val de Loire
- Coordinates: 46°37′51″N 1°28′53″E
- Country: France
- Region: Centre-Val de Loire
- Department: Indre
- Arrondissement: Châteauroux
- Canton: Argenton-sur-Creuse
- Intercommunality: Éguzon-Argenton-Vallée de la Creuse

Government
  - Mayor (2020–2026): Guillaume Chaussemy
- Area^{1}: 9.03 km^{2} (3.49 sq mi)
- Elevation: 100 m (330 ft)
- Highest elevation: 178 m (584 ft)
- Lowest elevation: 96 m (315 ft)
- Population (2023): 917
  - Density: 102/km^{2} (263/sq mi)
- Time zone: UTC+01:00 (CET)
  - Summer (DST): UTC+02:00 (CEST)
- INSEE/Postal code: 36161 /36800
- ^{1} French Land Register data, which excludes lakes, ponds, glaciers > 1 km^{2} (0.386 sq mi or 247 acres) and river estuaries.

Le Pont-Chrétien-Chabenet (French pronunciation: [lə pɔ̃ kʁetjɛ̃ ʃabnɛ]) is a commune in the Indre department in central France.

== Geography ==
The Bouzanne flows west through the northern part of the commune, then flows into the Creuse, which forms the commune's southwestern border.

== Population ==
Historical population
Year	Pop.	±% p.a.
1968	814	—
1975	813	−0.02%
1982	902	+1.50%
1990	879	−0.32%
1999	880	+0.01%
2007	939	+0.81%
2012	928	−0.24%
2017	925	−0.06%
2023	917	−0.14%
Source: INSEE

== Sights ==
- The oldest wooden covered bridge in France is in the commune.

== See also ==
- Communes of the Indre department
