= Buxières-d'Aillac =

- Commune
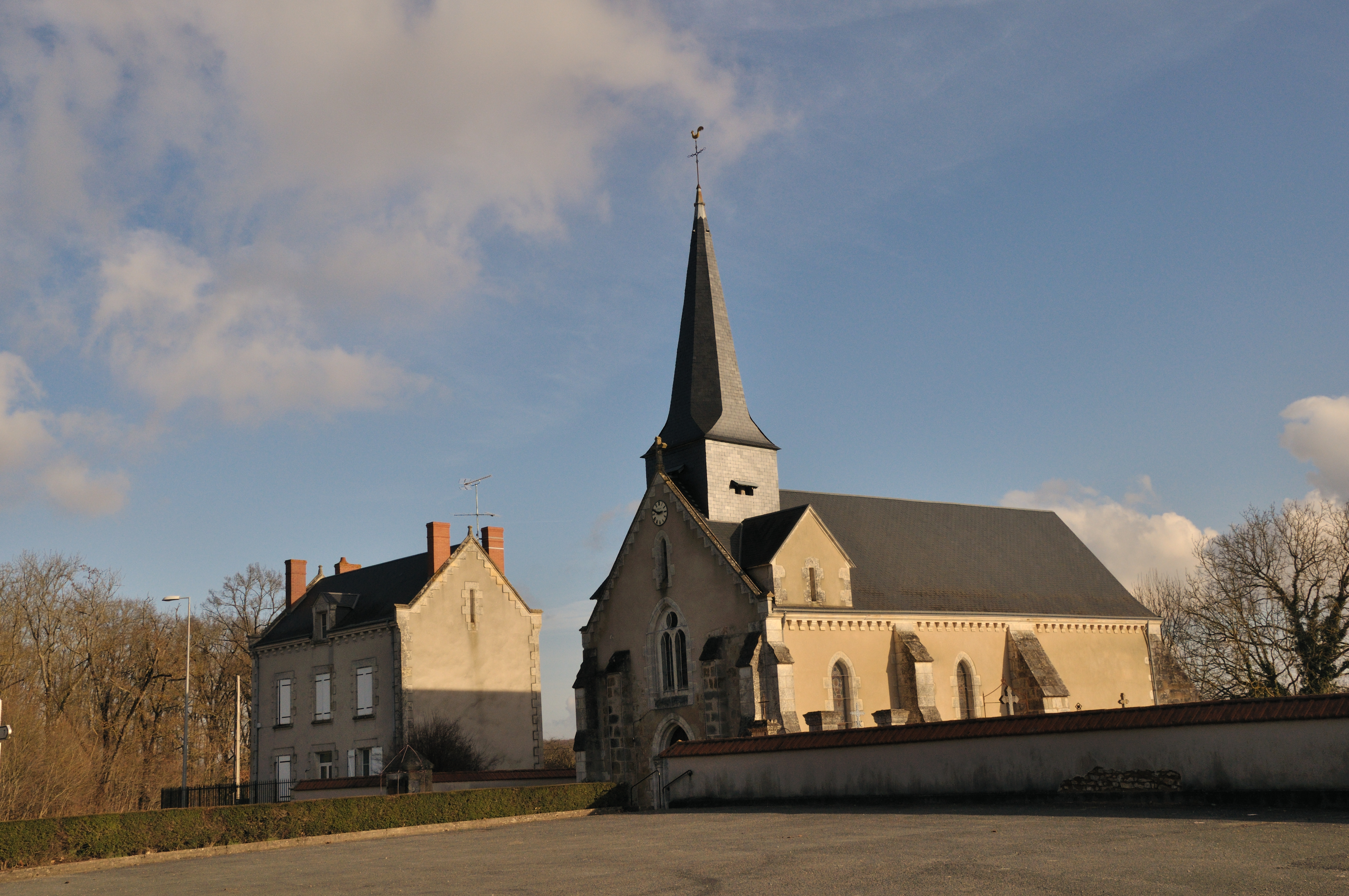
- The church in Buxières-d'Aillac
- Location of Buxières-d'Aillac
- Location within France Location within Centre-Val de Loire
- Coordinates: 46°38′21″N 1°45′12″E
- Country: France
- Region: Centre-Val de Loire
- Department: Indre
- Arrondissement: La Châtre
- Canton: Neuvy-Saint-Sépulchre

Government
  - Mayor (2020–2026): Didier Guenin
- Area^{1}: 25.75 km^{2} (9.94 sq mi)
- Elevation: 187 m (614 ft)
- Highest elevation: 222 m (728 ft)
- Lowest elevation: 155 m (509 ft)
- Population (2023): 238
  - Density: 9.24/km^{2} (23.9/sq mi)
- Time zone: UTC+01:00 (CET)
  - Summer (DST): UTC+02:00 (CEST)
- INSEE/Postal code: 36030 /36230
- ^{1} French Land Register data, which excludes lakes, ponds, glaciers > 1 km^{2} (0.386 sq mi or 247 acres) and river estuaries.

Buxières-d'Aillac (French pronunciation: [byksjɛʁ dajak]) is a commune in the Indre department in central France.

== Geography ==
The commune is traversed by the river Bouzanne.

== Population ==
Historical population
Year	Pop.	±% p.a.
1968	273	—
1975	223	−2.85%
1982	217	−0.39%
1990	246	+1.58%
1999	217	−1.38%
2007	215	−0.12%
2012	238	+2.05%
2017	256	+1.47%
2023	238	−1.21%
Source: INSEE

== See also ==
- Communes of the Indre department
