= La Buxerette =

- Commune
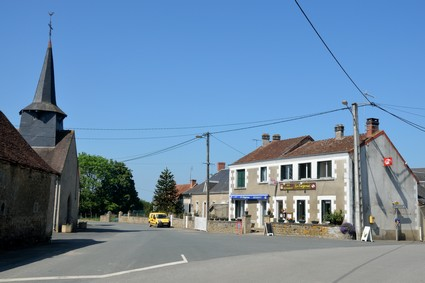
- The church square in La Buxerette
- Location of La Buxerette
- Location within France Location within Centre-Val de Loire
- Coordinates: 46°29′43″N 1°48′11″E
- Country: France
- Region: Centre-Val de Loire
- Department: Indre
- Arrondissement: La Châtre
- Canton: Neuvy-Saint-Sépulchre
- Intercommunality: Marche berrichonne

Government
  - Mayor (2021–2026): Philippe Allely
- Area^{1}: 10.99 km^{2} (4.24 sq mi)
- Elevation: 372 m (1,220 ft)
- Highest elevation: 387 m (1,270 ft)
- Lowest elevation: 282 m (925 ft)
- Population (2023): 103
  - Density: 9.37/km^{2} (24.3/sq mi)
- Time zone: UTC+01:00 (CET)
  - Summer (DST): UTC+02:00 (CEST)
- INSEE/Postal code: 36028 /36140
- ^{1} French Land Register data, which excludes lakes, ponds, glaciers > 1 km^{2} (0.386 sq mi or 247 acres) and river estuaries.

La Buxerette is a commune in the Indre department in central France.

== Geography ==
The Bouzanne forms the commune's western border.

== Population ==
Historical population
| Year | Pop. | ±% p.a. |
|---|---|---|
| 1968 | 270 | — |
| 1975 | 205 | −3.86% |
| 1982 | 183 | −1.61% |
| 1990 | 168 | −1.06% |
| 1999 | 128 | −2.98% |
| 2007 | 113 | −1.55% |
| 2012 | 105 | −1.46% |
| 2017 | 109 | +0.75% |
| 2023 | 103 | −0.94% |
Source: INSEE

== See also ==
- Communes of the Indre department
