= Fougerolles, Indre =

Administrative division in Centre-Val de Loire, France

Fougerolles
- Commune
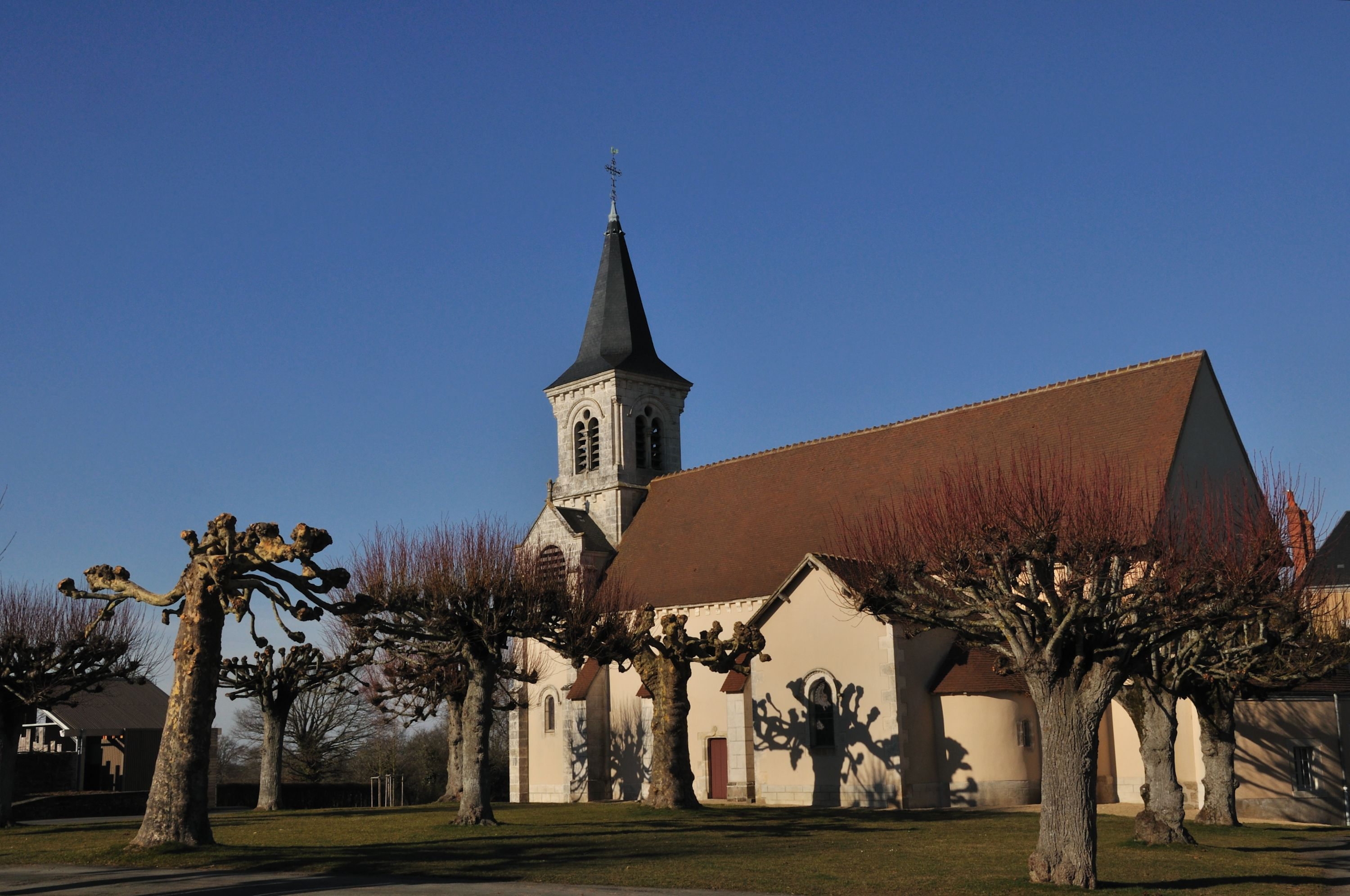
- The church of Saint-Pierre, in Fougerolles
- Location of Fougerolles
- Location within France Location within Centre-Val de Loire
- Coordinates: 46°33′50″N 1°52′02″E
- Country: France
- Region: Centre-Val de Loire
- Department: Indre
- Arrondissement: La Châtre
- Canton: Neuvy-Saint-Sépulchre

Government
  - Mayor (2020–2026): Arnaud Denormandie
- Area^{1}: 17.17 km^{2} (6.63 sq mi)
- Elevation: 250 m (820 ft)
- Highest elevation: 284 m (932 ft)
- Lowest elevation: 187 m (614 ft)
- Population (2023): 349
  - Density: 20.3/km^{2} (52.6/sq mi)
- Time zone: UTC+01:00 (CET)
  - Summer (DST): UTC+02:00 (CEST)
- INSEE/Postal code: 36078 /36230
- ^{1} French Land Register data, which excludes lakes, ponds, glaciers > 1 km^{2} (0.386 sq mi or 247 acres) and river estuaries.

Fougerolles (French pronunciation: [fuʒʁɔl]) is a commune in the Indre department in central France.

== Population ==
Historical population
Year	Pop.	±% p.a.
1968	377	—
1975	311	−2.71%
1982	289	−1.04%
1990	281	−0.35%
1999	287	+0.24%
2007	320	+1.37%
2012	340	+1.22%
2017	350	+0.58%
2023	349	−0.05%
Source: INSEE

== See also ==
- Communes of the Indre department
