= Saint-Denis-de-Jouhet =

- Commune
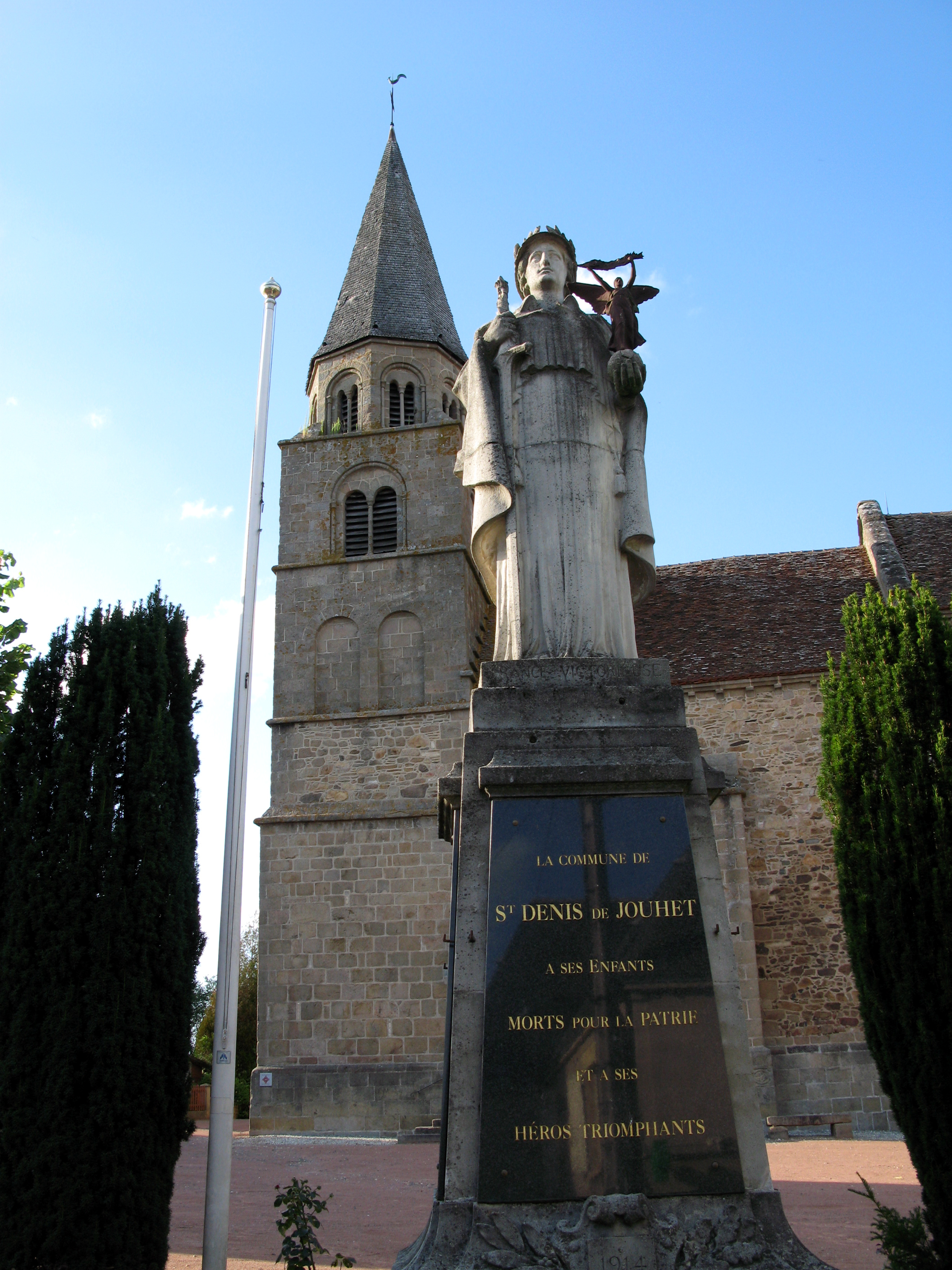
- The church and war memorial in Saint-Denis-de-Jouhet
- Location of Saint-Denis-de-Jouhet
- Location within France Location within Centre-Val de Loire
- Coordinates: 46°31′53″N 1°52′09″E
- Country: France
- Region: Centre-Val de Loire
- Department: Indre
- Arrondissement: La Châtre
- Canton: Neuvy-Saint-Sépulchre
- Intercommunality: Marche berrichonne

Government
  - Mayor (2020–2026): Bruno Simon
- Area^{1}: 43.48 km^{2} (16.79 sq mi)
- Elevation: 270 m (890 ft)
- Highest elevation: 382 m (1,253 ft)
- Lowest elevation: 227 m (745 ft)
- Population (2023): 953
  - Density: 21.9/km^{2} (56.8/sq mi)
- Time zone: UTC+01:00 (CET)
  - Summer (DST): UTC+02:00 (CEST)
- INSEE/Postal code: 36189 /36230
- ^{1} French Land Register data, which excludes lakes, ponds, glaciers > 1 km^{2} (0.386 sq mi or 247 acres) and river estuaries.

Saint-Denis-de-Jouhet (French pronunciation: [sɛ̃ dəni də ʒu.ɛ]) is a commune in the Indre department in central France.

== Population ==
Historical population
Year	Pop.	±% p.a.
1968	1,436	—
1975	1,348	−0.90%
1982	1,289	−0.64%
1990	1,200	−0.89%
1999	1,008	−1.92%
2007	957	−0.65%
2012	946	−0.23%
2017	971	+0.52%
2023	953	−0.31%
Source: INSEE

== See also ==
- Communes of the Indre department
