= Order of Saint Remi =

Catholic association based in France

- Ordre de Saint Remi
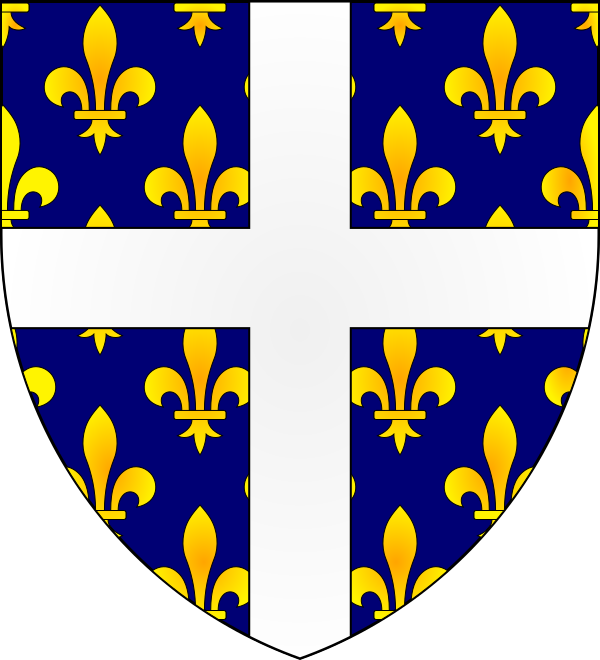
- Formation: 2016 (canonically erected 2018)
- Founders: Canon Frédéric Goupil de Maurey and Canon Sébastien Goupil de Maurey
- Founded at: Chartres, France
- Headquarters: Château du Magnet
- Official language: French
- Website: www.chapitredesaintremi.fr/qui-sommes-nous/

The Order of Saint Remi (French: Ordre de Saint Remi) is a Catholic public clerical association of the faithful based in France, and founded at Chartres Cathedral. The Order was founded to pray for the salvation of France and to offer the Traditional Latin Mass.

== History ==
The Order of Saint Remi was founded in 2018 at the Relic of the Veil of the Blessed Virgin Mary in Chartres Cathedral, France by two former Canons of the Institute of Christ the King Sovereign Priest, a Roman Catholic traditionalist society of apostolic life of pontifical right. In 2018, the community was canonically erected by Dominique Rey, the bishop of Fréjus-Toulon.
