= Louise Marie Madeleine Fontaine =

French salon-holder (1706–1799)

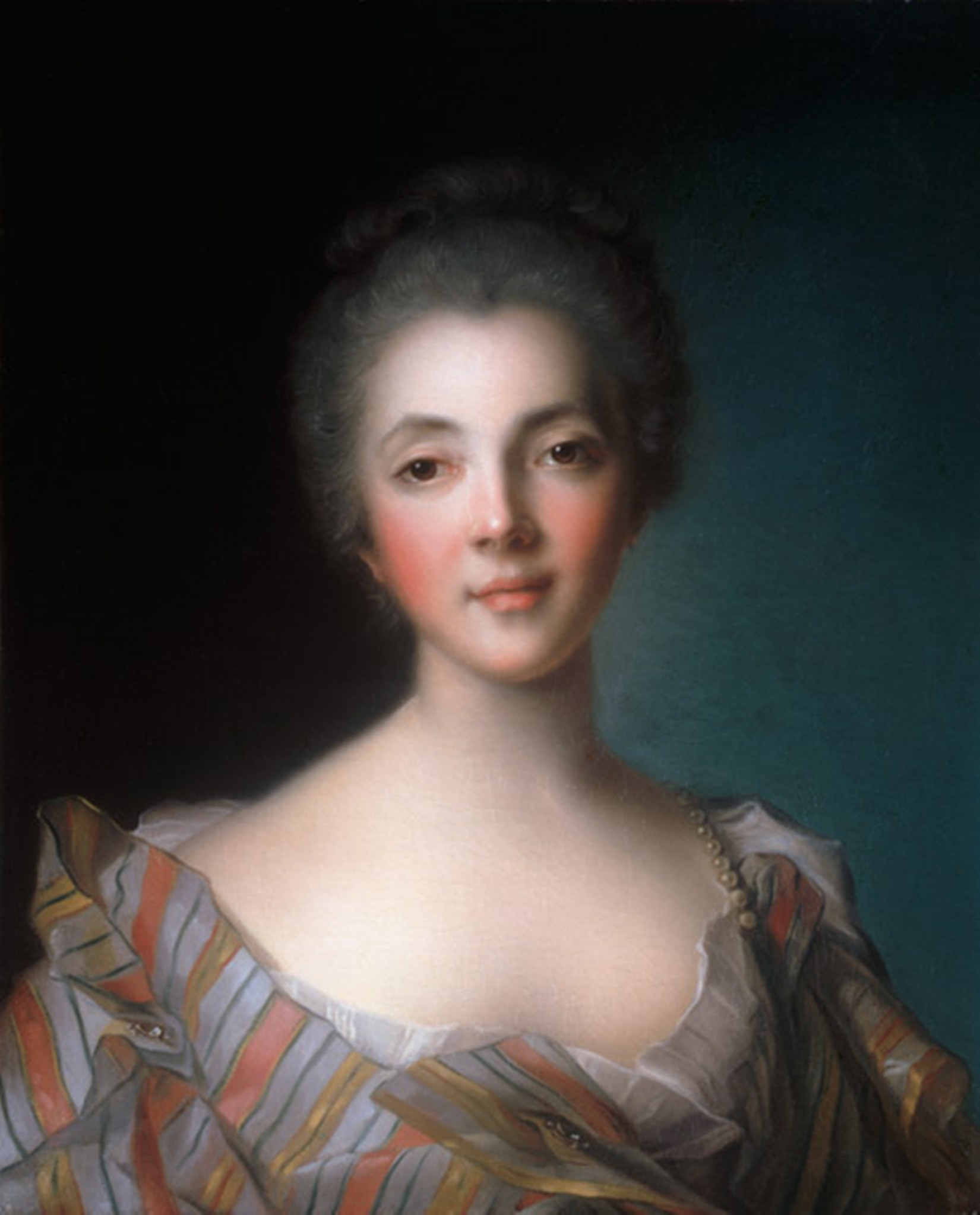
Madame Dupin Portrait by Jean-Marc Nattier, ca. 1730

Louise-Marie-Madeleine Guillaume de Fontaine (after marriage known as Madame Dupin; 28 October 1706 – 20 November 1799) was a French saloniste. A woman of spirit and famous for her beauty, between 1733 and 1782 she hosted a famous literary salon in Paris and owned the Château de Chenonceau, which was known as a center of the most famous French philosophers of the Age of Enlightenment.

== Life ==
=== Youth ===
Louise de Fontaine was born in Paris, in the parish of Saint-Roch, on 28 October 1706. Her baptism act was as follows:

Louise-Marie-Madeleine, daughter of Jean-Louis-Guillaume, ecuyer, Seigneur de Fontaine, councillor of the King, commissioner of the Navy and galleys de France and Marie-Anne-Armande Dancourt his wife born on the twenty-eight of October in the Sourdière street on this parish where was baptized, was the godfather the very high and very powerful Lord Louis d'Aumont de Roche baron duc d'Aumont, peer of France, first gentleman of the King's bedchamber and Governor of the town and castle of Bolougne and Bolougnese country, the godmother was Madeleine Clerjaut, wife of Samuel Bernard, Knight of the King's Order.

Signatures: Louis d'Aumont duc d'Aumont - Madeleine Clergeau Bernard - Jean Louis Guillaume de Fontaine - Goy.

Actually, Louise was the oldest of three illegitimate daughters of banker Samuel Bernard and Marie-Anne-Armande Carton Dancourt, nicknamed Manon, a daughter of actor Florent Carton Dancourt. Marie Dancourt was already married since 4 November 1702 at Paris in the parish of Saint-Sulpice with Jean-Louis-Guillaume de Fontaine, commissioner and controller of the Navy and War departments in Flanders and Picardy.

Manon's husband recognized Louise as his own with complacency, as well the two other children born from the affair with Bernard: Marie-Louise (born 25 August 1710) and Françoise-Thérèse (born 12 March 1712), both also baptized in the parish of Saint-Roch. During her marriage, Manon gave birth two other children, this time sired by her husband: Jeanne-Marie-Thérèse (born in 1705) and Jules-Armand (born on 3 April 1709), both also baptized in Saint-Roch.

The illegitimate daughters of Samuel Bernard are mentioned by Jean-Jacques Rousseau in his Confessions:

The three sisters must be called the Three Graces: Madame de la Touche, who escaped to England with the Duke of Kingston; Madame d'Arty, the mistress and even more, the friend, the unique and sincere love of the Prince of Conti, an adorable woman as much for her kindness, her charming character and the unalterable gaiety of her humor; and finally Madame Dupin, the most beautiful of the three and the only one who can't be criticized by her conduct.

Gaston de Villeneuve-Guibert describes the childhood of Louise:

Her parents, who owned a considerable fortune, made everything to develop the happy dispositions and natural qualities which she was endowed. The most seductive charm and figure, joined with a sharp mind, a high character, a precocious intelligence and great memory; she like much by her softness and by the grace and distinction of her person. Her mother put her in a convent, and soon she became in the idol of the community: students and mistresses were delighted with her cheerfulness, her talents, her projections; the upper cited as a marvel that everyone spoiled and that we were delighted.

=== Claude Dupin ===
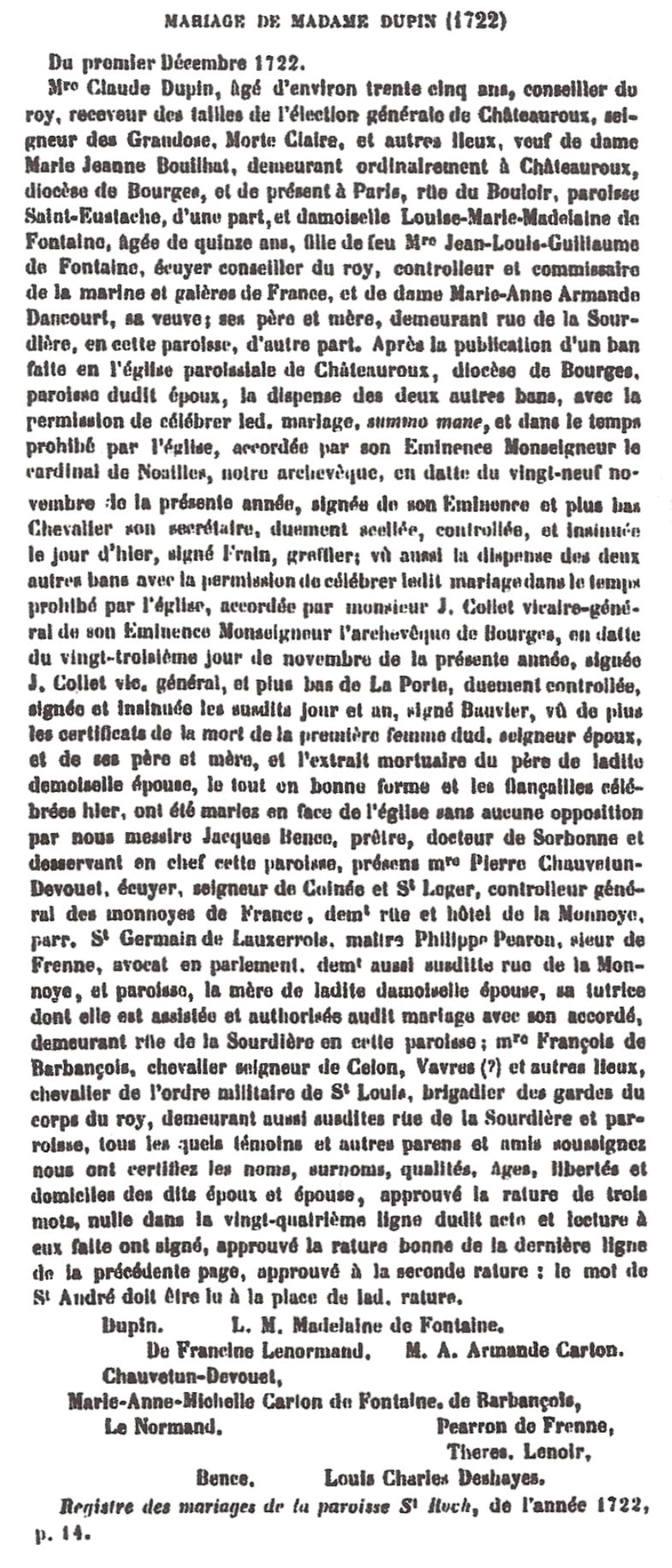
Marriage certificate of Louise de Fontaine and Claude Dupin, dated 1 December 1722 at Saint-Roch.

Samuel Bernard decided to engage his daughter Louise to Claude Dupin, a modest collector of Taille at Châteauroux. According to the columnist Barthélémy Mouffle d'Angerville in 1721 Claude Dupin helped the eldest daughter of the family, Jeanne-Marie-Thérèse de Fontaine, when she passed through Berry. She married with François II de Barbançois, Seigneur de Celon on 21 August 1720 and, returning from the baths of Bourbon-l'Archambault and in considerable pain, she received the hospitality of Claude Dupin. Once his guest was recovered, Dupin was persuaded to accompanied her to Paris, where he met Samuel Bernard, who impressed by his kindness, offered him the hand of Louise, aged only sixteen. In his forties, a widower and father of a six-year-old son Louis-Claude (who became in the grandfather of the novelist George Sand), this move was unexpected and he readily agreed, because with this proposal came the appointment of Receiver General of finances in Metz and Alsace.

On 29 November 1722 was signed the marriage contract and the religious ceremony was celebrated on 1 December in the Church of Saint-Roch. Thanks to the support of his father-in-law, Claude Dupin became part of the Ferme générale on 1 October 1726, after he sold his office in Châteauroux. Samuel Bernard obtained this new post for his protégé, for a total of 500,000 livres. The banker abandoned the debt a few years later, and providing the couple with the cancellation of any acknowledgment of debt. On 24 December 1728 Dupin bought the post of Councillor-Secretary of the King, House and Crown of France and finances. This acquisition allows him to be accepted as part of the nobility in the first degree, with his offspring.

Louise gives birth to a son, Jacques-Armand on 3 March 1727 in Paris.

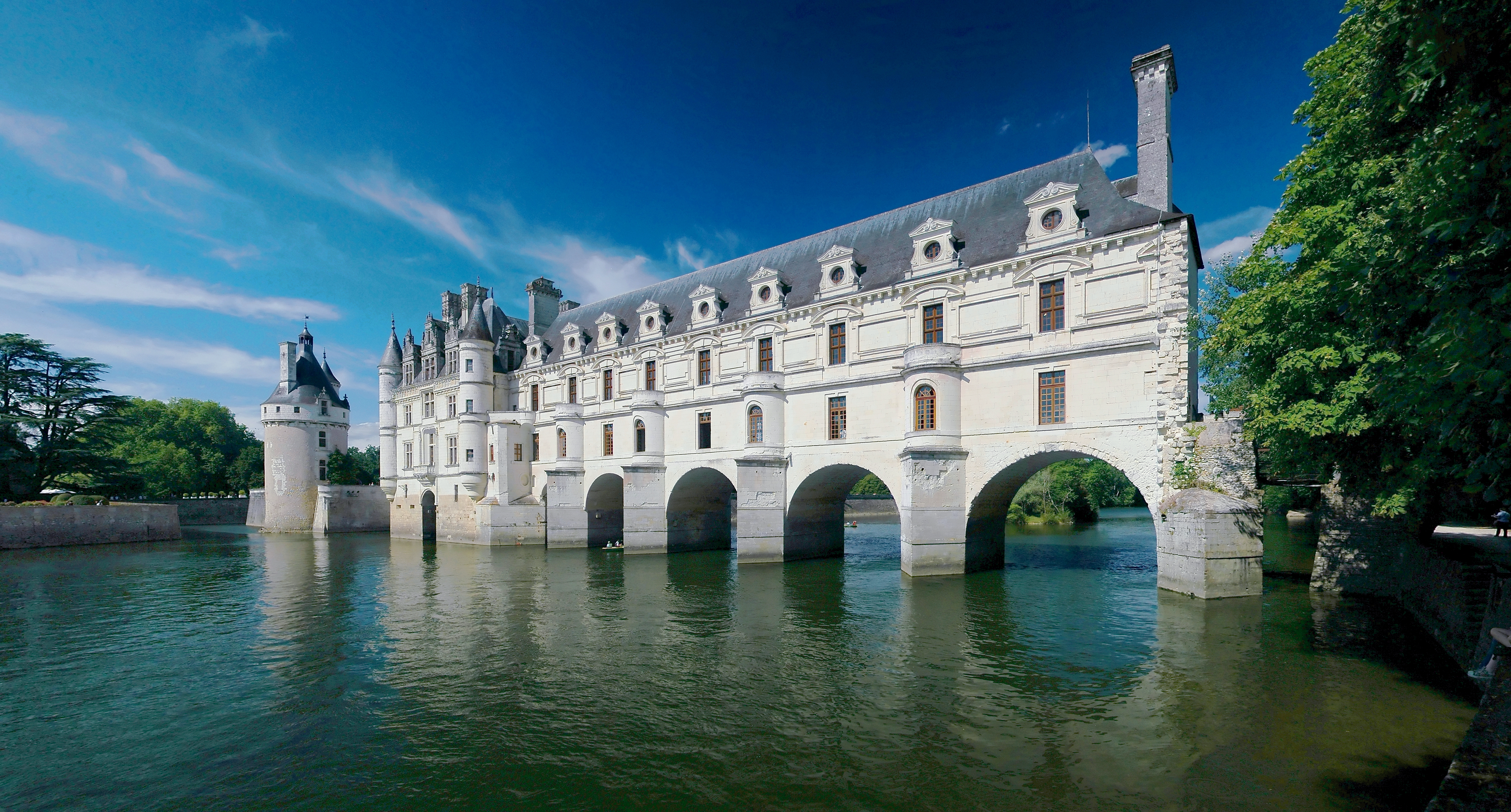
Chateau de Chenonceau.

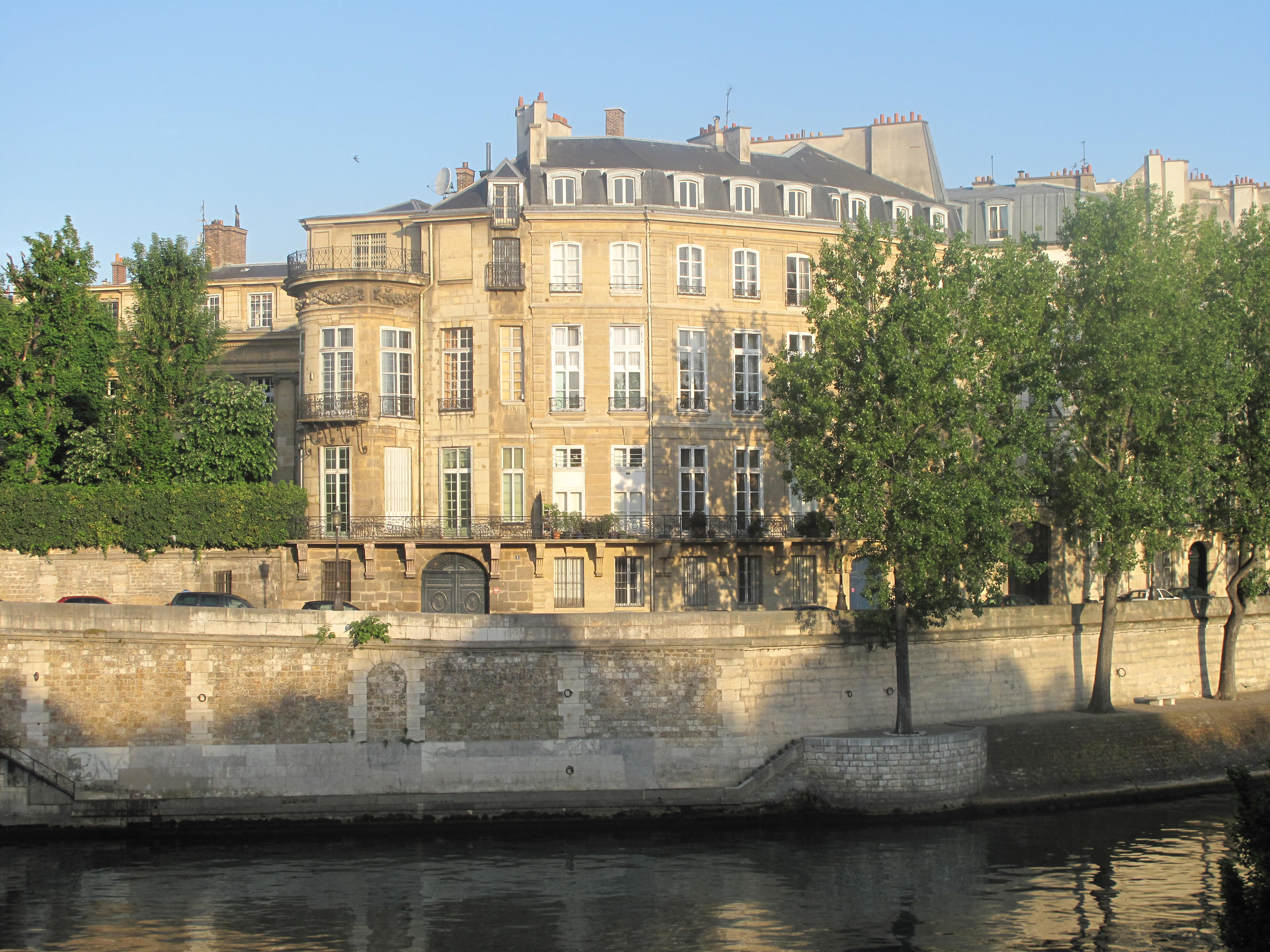
Hôtel Lambert.

Thanks to the generosity of Samuel Bernard and his income of the Ferme générale, Claude Dupin could obtain a considerable fortune, mainly in lands. Monsieur and Madame Dupin occupied a privileged position and had a lavish lifestyle. On 12 April 1732 Claude Dupin, jointly with his mother-in-law Manon Dancourt, bought the prestigious Hôtel Lambert in the Île Saint-Louis for the sum of 140,000 livres. On 9 June 1733 he acquired the magnificent Château de Chenonceau from the Duke of Bourbon for 130,000 livres. Each year, the Dupins spent the autumn in the Touraine. Starting in April 1741, Louise, with her husband, son and stepson, remained in the Hôtel de Vins, located in the Parisian Plâtrière street and from 1752 they also owned a house in Clichy-sur-Seine where they spent the summer months. On 24 April 1738 with the acquisition of the Marquisate of Blanc and the Castellany of Cors, located at the limits of Berry and Poitou, they completed their patrimony. The Marquisate of Blanc included the Château-Naillac, the château de Roche, the Château de Rochefort, Château de Cors, Château de Forges, with his respectives properties, farms, ponds and lands, who produced a total of 555,000 livres, four times the prize of Chenonceau. But soon difficulties arose with the Countess of Parabère, the former owner, who caused the sequestration of Blanc lands and only after a decree of the Parlement of Paris dated 2 September 1739, confirmed by a judgment of 11 December, confirmed Claude Dupin as the legitimate owner of this lands and could recovered them.

Samuel Bernard died on 18 January 1739 and according to the succession of his estate, Claude Dupin was forced to abandon the Hôtel Lambert the following 31 March.

On 16 April 1741 Monsieur and Madame Dupin officially take possession of the city of Blanc, according to the feudal tradition:

The official procession was formed. The new feudal lord, armed and helmeted with his entourage advanced. Near him stood the pretty Marchioness of 34 years, and their children. All the noble citizens of Blanc, officers of court and administrators followed them. The people of the city, placed on the passage, looked them. The Reverend Father received them with a high mass. After the service, they visited the local monastery. The Reverend Father then walked with the beautiful Marchioness and gently asked not accompany her husband to visit their home, because this was against the customes.

Madame Dupin said with all her grace: the most valuable use we can make of our rights is to make them acceptable to those upon whom we have these rights. Since it didn't suit her that she not enter into her house, she didn't get in.

=== Madame Dupin ===
Monsieur and Madame Dupin had a prominent place in the finance world and are well related with the aristocracy. Their prosperity facilitated this social climbing, along with the qualities of Madame Dupin who widely contributed with this integration. Voltaire nicknamed her the goddess of beauty and music; indeed Louise Dupin was famous for her charm and spirit. She participated in the writings of her husband, most notably in the volumes of Observations on the Spirit of Laws, but also worked in her own projects.

Beautiful, intelligent and cultivated, her seductive power attracted all the sympathies, including men of letters, philosophers and scholars. In this circle and the dinners that she hosted, Madame Dupin had animated conversations, led the debates and proposed discussions. In the Hôtel Lambert, Chenonceau or in the Hôtel de Vins, she held a literary and scientific salon: among her notable guests were Voltaire, the Abbot of Saint-Pierre, Fontenelle, Marivaux, Montesquieu, Buffon, Marmontel, Mably, Condillac, Grimm, Bernis and Rousseau; in addition, she received a great number of the French nobility, like the Princess of Rohan, the Countess of Forcalquier, the Duchess of Lévis-Mirepoix, the Baroness Hervey and the Princess of Monaco. Madame du Deffand was also received, although perhaps she was the only one who spoke unfavorably about Louise Dupin; this probably was because of a typical case of jealousy: the authoritarian hostess of the salon in the Saint-Dominique street found it difficult to accept that her guests attended other circles. During the Enlightenment, the salons were an integral part of social life of the elites, and played an essential role in the dissemination of ideas, social and political protest.

Louise Dupin came from a family of artists through her mother, all of whom studied at the Comédie-Française. The sense of theater was somehow innate in her. She set up a small theater at the southern end of the gallery on the first floor of Chenonceau and indulged in her passion. She also practiced philanthropy. A staunch feminist, Louise demanded education for women and access to public office and professions that until then had been the exclusive preserve of men.

=== Jean-Jacques Rousseau ===
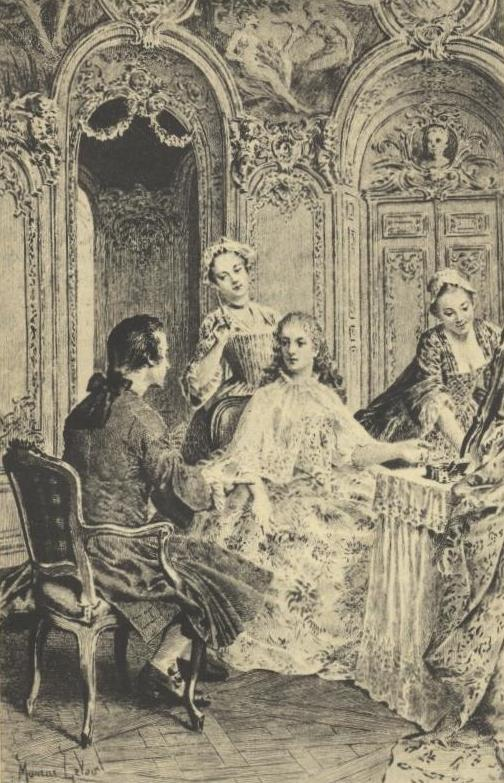
Madame Dupin received Rousseau in Paris.

During 1745-1751, Louise Dupin appointed Jean-Jacques Rousseau as secretary and tutor of her son. But their first meeting was far from idyllic. Rousseau arrived to Paris in the autumn of 1741. He was received by Madame Dupin in Plâtrière street in March 1743 thanks to a letter of recommendation, with the purpose to present a comedy called Narcisse and one Musical notation. Once he meet her, Rousseau felt a lively passion for Madame Dupin:

Madame Dupin was still, when I saw for the first time, one of the most beautiful women in Paris. She received me at her toilette. She had her bare arms, her hair disheveled, her bathrobe badly arranged. This was very new for me. My poor head was almost lost. This disturbs me. I digress. And in short, I am in love with Madame Dupin. My confusion didn't seem to hurt me with her, because she didn't noticed my feelings. She received the book and the author, spoke of my project very educated, she sang accompanied by the harpsichord, and kept me to dinner, put next to her at the table. This almost make me mad.

Jean-Jacques Rousseau subsequently sent an inflamed letter to Madame Dupin, who returns him expressing her concern. This doesn't stop the writer for much and only the intervention of Louise's stepson put an end to his attentions. But Madame Dupin was hardly spiteful and some months after these incidents, takes Rousseau in her service and put him in charge of the education of her son Jacques-Armand for eight days pending for a new tutor. Subsequently, the Dupins taken Jean-Jacques Rousseau as secretary after their return from Venice in 1745, when he is not yet a writer and for a modest salary. His job was to take notes and research for the book projected by Madame Dupin, namely the defense of women in the 18th century are discussed in minor ... until they died. Madame Dupin stood Rousseau almost to a subordinate or, in the words of Grimm and Marmontel, she gives him leave the day it receives academicians. Jean-Jacques Rousseau feels bitterness after leaving his job as a secretary in 1751, but will always keep good relations with the Dupin family. Madame Dupin provides financial support to his wife, Marie-Thérèse Levasseur, who gave birth to five children abandoned by Rousseau to the Foundling Hospital. As for Louis Claude Dupin, his bound with Rousseau came for their common passion for music. The stepson of Madame Dupin was interested in physics, chemistry and natural history, hoping to integrate the Academy of Sciences and the philosopher did write an unfinished book, popular science to Institutions of Chemistry.

=== Dark years ===
On 9 October 1749, Jacques-Armand Dupin married Louise-Alexandrine-Julie de Rochechouart-Pontville at the Church of Saint-Sulpice, Paris. But for Louise and her husband, their son continued to be the source of trouble, especially when he ran up large debts from gambling. His father had to sell many of his assets in 1750 to honor the debts of his son. The troubles with Jacques-Armand, however, continued. Claude Dupin was forced to obtain a Lettre de cachet, which led to Jacques-Armand being imprisoned in the fortress of Pierre Encise under the pretext of madness. After this, the family decided to send him to the Île Maurice on 26 October 1765, where he remained for the next two years until his death on 3 May 1767, a victim of yellow fever. Before embarking on the Count of Artois, a merchant ship of the French East India Company, Jacques-Armand reportedly revealed to his mother the existence of an illegitimate daughter of his, called Marie-Thérèse Adam, (Note: Marie-Thérèse had been born in Paris on 13 November 1755 (the date of 1753 given in some works is erroneous) and baptized the next day, on 14 November in the parish of Saint-Paul. Her parentage remains questionable, and various theories have been issued. Officially, she was the daughter of the coachman Jacques Adam and Nicole Avrillon, who lived in the Rue des Tournelles. Her godfather was her older brother Jean-François Adam and her godmother was Marie-Thérèse Avrillon, both residents in La Villette, in the parish of Saint-Laurent. In the household of Jacques-Armand Dupin de Chenonceaux appeared a coachman named Nicolas Adam. After the death of Madame Dupin on 20 November 1799, Marie-Thérèse Adam moved to the Rue de la Roquette in Paris, in a house inherited by her benefactress. The young Pierre Bretonneau (born in Saint-Georges-sur-Cher on 3 April 1778) came to live with her after finishing his studies, despite the 23 years of difference between them. The marriage contract between them was signed on 18 May 1801 and the wedding took place on 2 June in the town hall of Place des Vosges. Pierre Bretonneau obtained his doctorate the same year. The couple then decided to move to Chenonceaux into another inherited property, La Renaudière, acquired in December 1789 by 5,505 livres by Madame Dupin. Pierre Bretonneau, a simple Officier de santé, was a mayor of Chenonceaux from 1803 to 1807. He resumed his studies, moved to Paris, spent his thesis and became the chief physician of the Tours hospital. His researches enable it to identify the typhoid fever and diphtheria. It revolutionized the medicine of his time, but in parallel with its prestigious and famous career, Pierre Bretonneau abandoned his wife, although his correspondence with her showed a special affection between them. Marie-Thérèse Adam died at his home in La Renaudière on 13 January 1836. She was firstly buried in Chenonceaux, but later her remains were transferred to the crypt of Dr. Bretonneau at Saint-Cyr-sur-Loire. Her union with Pierre Bretonneau was childless.) whose origins, however, remained mysterious. Nevertheless, Louise Dupin took care of the child and raised her as her own, later making Marie-Thérèse her reader and heiress. Louise considered Marie-Thérèse as her own daughter and raised her after her own image, educating her in high culture and manners. Marie-Thérèse Adam seemed to have been entirely dedicated to Louise Dupin and remained at her side until Louise Dupin's death.

On 25 February 1769, Claude Dupin died in Paris. He left a fortune estimated at more than two million gold francs. Louis-Claude Dupin denounces his father's will, dated 15 January 1768, and claimed half of the inheritance. Finally, after protracted negotiations, the result of the liquidation of the estate was divided in 1772 between Madame Dupin, Louis-Claude and Claude-Sophie Dupin (the only son of the late Jacques-Armand). Louise received Chenonceau with all its furniture, the Marquisate of Blanc, and the Hôtel de Vins on Plâtrière street. On 18 September 1788, Claude-Sophie died in Chenonceau aged 38. After the loss of her grandson without issue, Louise Dupin had no direct descendants.

On 10 August 1792, the people seized the Tuileries Palace. Three years before, the French Revolution had begun, but 10 August 1792 marked the end of the monarchy with the arrest of Louis XVI and Marie Antoinette. France has been at war since 20 April, and Paris was threatened by Prussian armies after the Brunswick Manifesto on 25 July. Massacres are perpetrated in Parisian prisons in early September. Louise Dupin decided to leave Paris for Chenonceau. She could have emigrated after the Storming of the Bastille in 1789, as per the advice of her friends, but chose to stay in France and retire in Touraine when the first Reign of Terror swept the country. On 11 September 1792, she settled permanently in Chenonceau, accompanied by her friend, the Countess of Forcalquier, her step-granddaughter Madeleine-Suzanne Dupin de Francueil, (Note: Madeleine-Suzanne Dupin de Francueil was the daughter of Louis-Claude Dupin de Francueil and his first wife, Suzanne Bollioud de Saint-Jullien. She was born in Paris on 14 July 1751. She married firstly in Paris on 9 February 1768 at the parish of Saint-Eustache with Pierre-Armand Vallet de Villeneuve. They had two sons, both born in the Hôtel Dupin: René-François Vallet de Villeneuve (born 7 June 1777) and Auguste-Louis Vallet de Villeneuve (born 4 August 1779). She married secondly with Joseph Delaville Le Roulx at Chenonceaux on 25 June 1796. After the death of her father on 6 June 1786, Madeleine-Suzanne inherited the Hôtel Dupin, but Madame Dupin retain the usufruct until her death in 1799. She sold the Hôtel in 1809 and died in Rome on 18 October 1812.) her step great-grandchildren René-François and Auguste-Louis Vallet de Villeneuve (sons of Madeleine-Suzanne), and her housekeeper and reader, Marie-Thérèse Adam. Over the years, Louise Dupin managed to preserve Chenonceau.

On 12 March 1794, Louise's step grandson-in-law and nephew Pierre-Armand Vallet de Villeneuve, committed suicide in prison in the Conciergerie, aged 62. He was the King's secretary, General Treasurer of the City of Paris and the Receiver General of Finances in Metz. Sentenced by the Revolutionary Tribunal, he escaped a brutal end on the guillotine. Louise managed to save his sons René and Auguste, spared because of their young ages. On 25 November 1793, Marie-Aurore de Saxe, second wife of Louise's late stepson Louis-Claude, was incarcerated firstly at Port-Royal Abbey and later in the English convent at Fossés-Saint-Victor Street. She was released some months later, on 21 August 1794. In 1796, one of the farmers of Madame Dupin in the Château de Rochefort in the Indre department, was tortured by burning his feet; the criminals, nicknamed the Chauffeurs, were a plague in the region.

=== The Lady of Chenonceau ===
Madame Dupin passed her estate to her step-greatgrandson, Count René-François Vallet de Villeneuve and his wife Apolline de Guibert. Chenonceaux remained in the family until 1864. The Marquisate of Blanc went to René's younger brother Auguste-Louis Vallet de Villeneuve, Treasurer of the City of Paris and husband of Laure-Antoinette de Ségur, a daughter of Count Louis-Philippe de Ségur.

Georges Touchard-Lafosse at the age of 17, paid a visit to Madame Dupin in 1797. He later evokes it:

She had kept the most animated conversation with a brilliant memory of curious episodes; her mind seemed to have lost nothing of her vivacity or grace: she was a book of more attractive and interest talks.

The following year (1798), Louise Dupin received a young man with a promising future, Pierre Bretonneau, student of medicine. He was a son of Pierre Bretonneau (master in surgery and doctor of Madame Dupin) by his wife Elisabeth Lecomte. His uncle was the Abbot François Lecomte, pastor of Chenonceaux and stage manager of the Château.

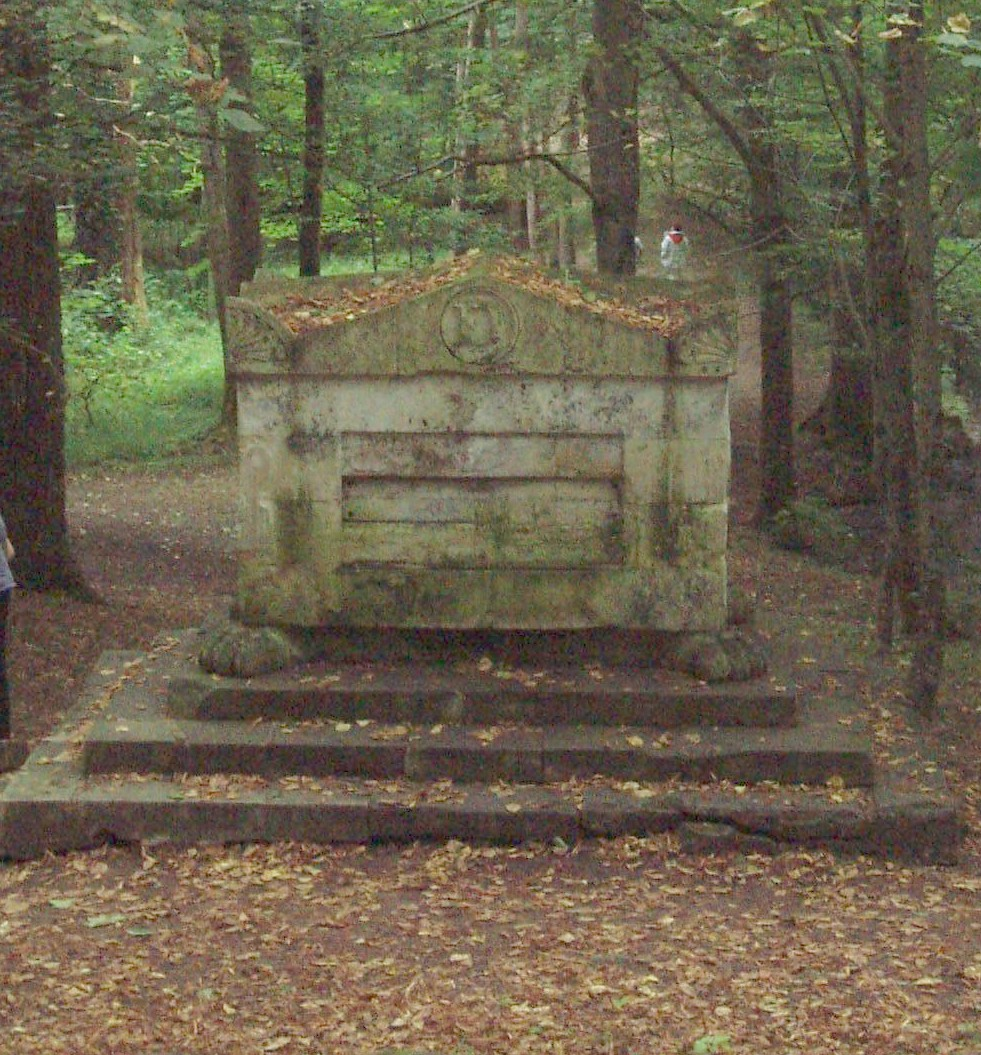
Tomb of Louise Dupin at Chenonceau forest.

Louise Dupin ended her life at Chenonceau in great solitude, her better and happy days now a distant memory. On 20 November 1799 at five o'clock in the morning, Madame Dupin died aged 93, in her room of the now called Apartments of Francis I in the west facade of the Château. Her last wishes (indicating a fear of being buried alive by mistake) were respected:

I want [the attendants] to wait at least 48 hours to be sure of my death; then my eyes will be closed in my bed, with my face left uncovered the way I always lived [...] If I die from some disease or accident, I do not wish the cause of it to be sought [...] I don't want to be touched, and wish to be buried by the women of my household, and I have designated Louise Morillon, Henriette Bossé wife of Henry and Marie-Anne Chavigny to render this last service to me [...] I absolutely want to be placed in a pine coffin and I herenby entrust my heirs that, wherever my death should occur, they carry my body to Chenonceaux with the greatest simplicity and bury me in the place I have chosen.

The place that Madame Dupin chose was located on the left bank of the Cher river, in the shade of large trees in the park of Francueil. Her heirs erected a heavy tombstone at the place designated by the Lady of Chenonceau for her last sleep.

== Properties ==
Madame Dupin had the following properties:

- The Hôtel Lambert, in the Île Saint-Louis in Paris from 1732 to 1739. This hotel was jointly bought on 12 April 1732 by Claude Dupin with his mother-in-law, Manon Dancourt. This place was the winter resident of the Dupins in Paris. The Hôtel Lambert was sold 31 March 1739 as part of the estate of Samuel Bernard to Marquis Florent-Claude du Châtelet-Lomont and his wife Gabrielle Émilie Le Tonnelier de Breteuil.
- Hôtel de Latour-Maubourg, located at nº 10 of Place Vendôme in Paris from 1740 to 1741. The Hôtel was leased by Claude Dupin, pending the completion of the works in his next Hôtel in Plâtrière street. During this period, Madame Dupin staying at Chateau de Chenonceau, acquired in 1733.
- Hôtel de Vins, in the Plâtrière street (now Jean-Jacques-Rousseau street), dependent of the parish of Saint-Eustache, Paris. The Dupins loved this Hôtel and they settled there after two years of works. It was in this house that Jean-Jacques Rousseau was introduced to Madame Dupin, in March 1743. On 22 February 1758, Claude Dupin and his wife finally buy this place to Marc Antoine Bouret, receiver general of finances, for the amount of 190,000 livres. Claude Dupin dies in this Hôtel on 25 February 1769. The Hôtel de Vins was a promised inheritance to his eldest son, Louis-Claude Dupin de Francueil after the death of his stepmother Madame Dupin; however, he died before her on 6 June 1786, so the property finally passed to his daughter, Suzanne-Madeleine Dupin de Francueil, from the estate of Madame Dupin in 1799.
- A house in Clichy-sur-Seine bought in 1752, used by the Dupins as a summer residence. Madame Dupin was still owner of this place in 1792.
- The Château de Chenonceau, bought on 9 June 1733 by Claude Dupin from the Duke of Bourbon. Madame Dupin went with her husband in the fall of each year to the banks of Cher river. After the death of her husband in 1769, Madame Dupin visits several times this place and prolongs her stay in Touraine. She settled permanently in Chenonceau during the French Revolution, on 11 September 1792. Madame Dupin dies in this jewel of the Loire Valley on 20 November 1799.
- Hôtel acquired on 23 November 1748 by Claude Dupin and Manon Dancourt to the Bailli Louis Fontenettes in the lower town of Blanc, on the market square in front of the Augustinian convent, for 8,000 livres. The Château-Naillac was uncomfortable (previously served as prison), so this residence welcomes the new owners of the marquisate, during their esporadic visits to Berry. The Hôtel will be renamed "House of the Marquise" in memory of Madame Dupin, who came only a few times to Blanc.

== Legacy ==
=== Works ===
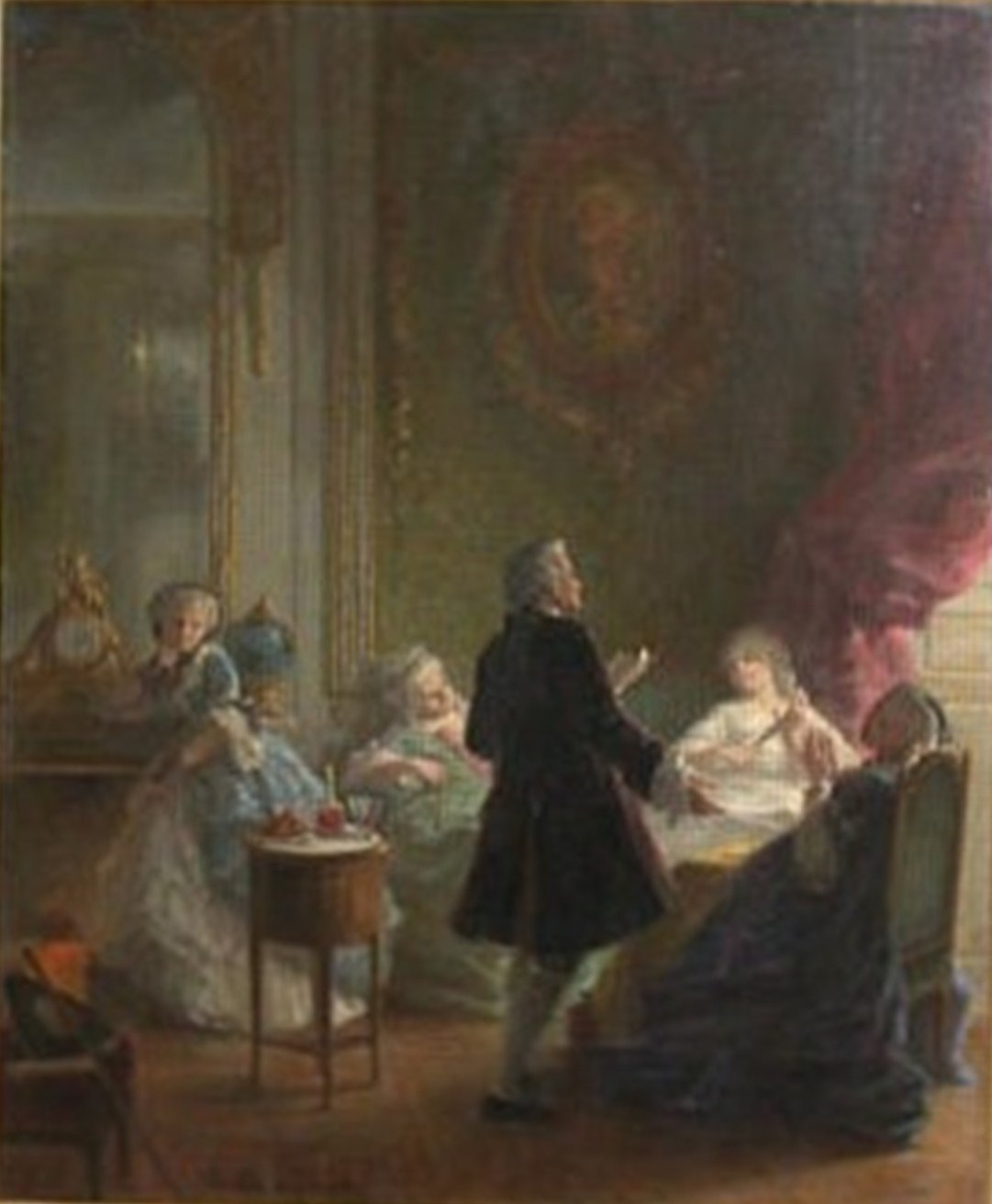
Rousseau reading his book The bold commitment to Louise Dupin and other women at Chenonceau, autumn 1747.

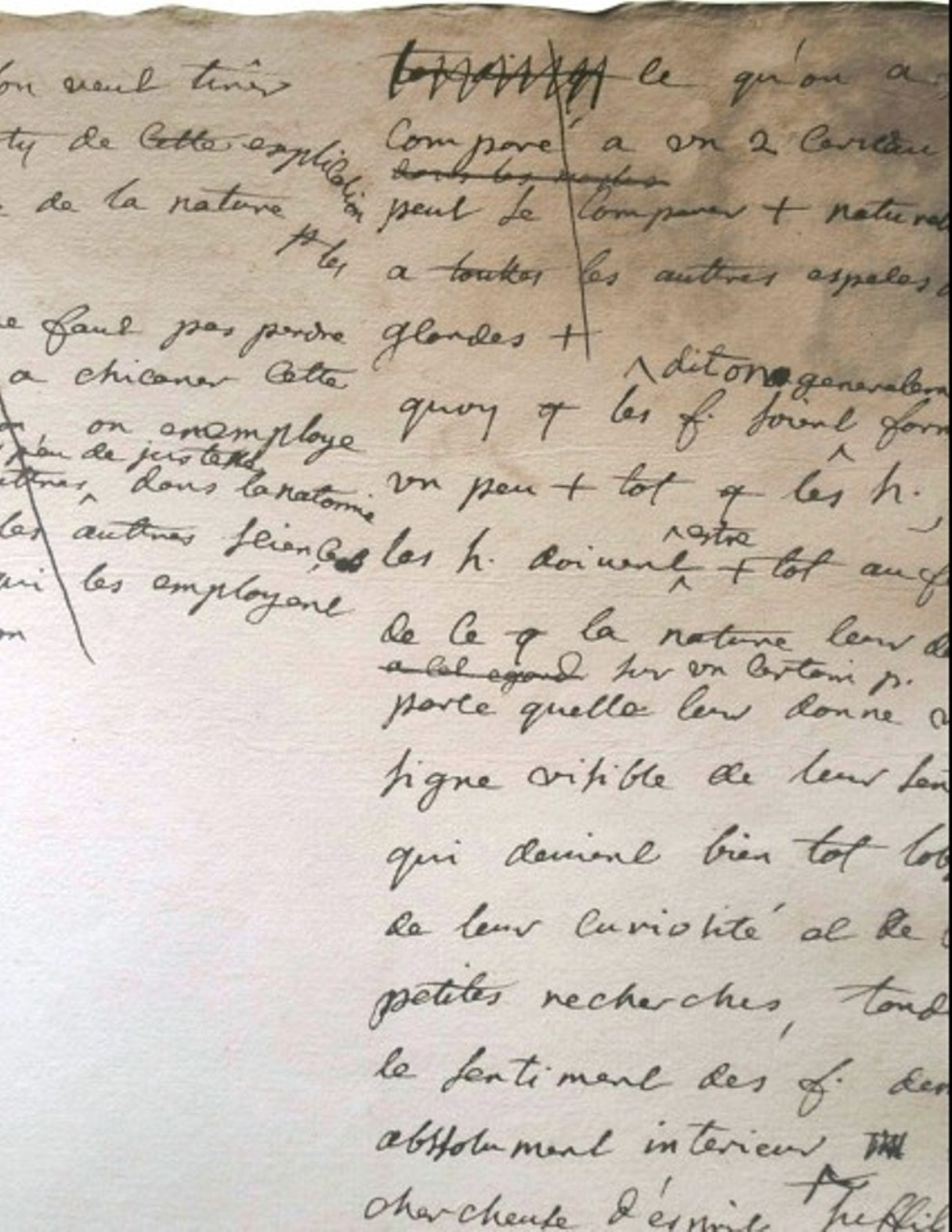
Extract of Louise Dupin's book On the equality of men and women, manuscript by Rousseau, ca. 1745-1751.

- Madame Dupin contributes to the writings of her husband Claude Dupin, author of a book on two volumes, "Reflections on some parts of a book called the Spirit of the laws" in 1749, refuting the arguments advanced by Montesquieu in his study "The Spirit of the Laws" published the previous year, in 1748. Claude Dupin defends the bankers attacked by Montesquieu, while taking care not to name the philosopher and observing for himself the anonymity. Indeed, Montesquieu has a high protector, Madame de Pompadour. The reaction of Montesquieu wasn't waited and asked his protector to intervene in his favor. With his help, Montesquieu could deleted the editions of Claude Dupin. However, the book of Montesquieu was placed in the Index Librorum Prohibitorum in 1751 and the Pope prohibits his reading. Claude Dupin published in 1752, a new but more moderate version of three volumes: "Observations on a book called Spirit of the laws" and that criticism, well argued, didn't know the fate of the first edition. This confrontation causes the rupture of relations between Montesquieu and the Dupins.
- On the equality of men and women, a book wrote by Madame Dupin with a real commitment to feminism. With the defense of the cause of women, an area that is close to her heart, she challenged the reasoning of Montesquieu, who exhibits on his works a clear misogyny (is believed that in fact the hate of Montesquieu to women was caused by jealousy to Jean-Jacques Rousseau and the rejection of Madame Dupin to his advances, and for this conflict he attacked Claude Dupin in his work The Spirit of the Laws). This book of 1,200 pages, written with the assistance of Jean-Jacques Rousseau, was unfortunately never published. Is uncertain why Madame Dupin renounced to the idea of her book could be known after years of work; probably because, despite being a salon-holder in the middle of the 18th century, she didn't have the complete freedom to publish this type of material. Olivier Marchal, author of two books about Jean-Jacques Rousseau, supports this explanation:

Like Madame Geoffrin and even Louise d'Epinay, Louise Dupin also waives to any claim of her beautiful spirit. She therefore decided not to publish, and none of her works will appear in her lifetime. At that time, that is often described as feminist, women will be inevitably exposes to the ridicule when dares to compete with men in the most serious areas. For not having understood (or accepted?), Madame du Châtelet (who translated Newton into French), was the subject of the worst mockeries. Less emancipated, Louise Dupin finally agreed to stick into her role: that of one of the most notable salon-holders of her time.

=== Literature ===
- George Sand greatly admired Madame Dupin, her step-great-grandmother:

Despite the reputation of wit and charm she enjoyed, and praised by her contemporaries, this remarkable woman has never wanted to occupy in the republic the true place that she deserved. She was firstly Mademoiselle de Fontaine, and passed for being the daughter of Samuel Bernard, at least according to the reports of Jean-Jacques Rousseau. She brought a considerable dowry to Monsieur Dupin; I don't remember which of the two was the owner of Chenonceaux, but it's certain that the two of them had a huge fortune. They had at Paris the Hôtel Lambert, who turned in one of the finest residences in the world. We know how Jean-Jacques Rousseau became secretary to Monsieur Dupin, and lived in Chenonceaux with them, how he fell in love with Madame Dupin, who was as beautiful as an angel, and how he risked imprudently everything in a declaration that was rejected. He nevertheless kept up friendly relations with her and her stepson Francueil. Madame Dupin cultivated literature and philosophy without ostentation and without attaching her name to the works of her husband, which, however, she could claim I am sure the best part and the best ideas [...] Monsieur and Madame Dupin worked at a book on women merits, when Jean-Jacques lived with them. He helped to take notes and do researches, and it piled on it substantial materials still remaining in the state of manuscripts in the château de Chenonceaux. The work wasn't performed, because of the death of Monsieur Dupin, and Madame Dupin, for modesty, never published her work. Some summaries of opinions, written in her own hand, in the humble way of Essays, yet deserve to see the day, were it only as a historical document to join the philosophical history of the last century. This amiable woman is the family of beautiful and good spirits of her time, and it's perhaps much regret that it has not devoted her life to develop and spread the light she carried in her heart.

- The writer Olivier Marchal in his work Rousseau, la comédie des masques, praised the personality of Madame Dupin:

The mansion occupied by Madame Dupin was located just down the Plâtrière street [...] Rousseau walked to her little salon and went into the waiting room after having announced by the valet. When taking place on the bench, he smoothed his brocade vest and adjusted his sword. Although he was at his service for nearly four years, Jean-Jacques had never felt at ease in the presence of Madame Dupin. Barely older than him, she had nevertheless managed to preserve her beauty. The grace and elegance of her manners were still enhanced by the delicacy of her features. We can found into her circle the most prestigious guests from Voltaire to Buffon, but also the most prominent members of the Parisian aristocracy. Lively and witty, she was praised even in the homes of other salon-holders. Yet it was in the privacy of one-on-one that the young woman disturbed Jean-Jacques. Her face had a very white complexion, her blond hair pulled back and the softness of her voice made her almost unreal. In those moments, we thought he was dying to talk to her in a whisper, for fear of breaking the spell.

=== Portraits ===
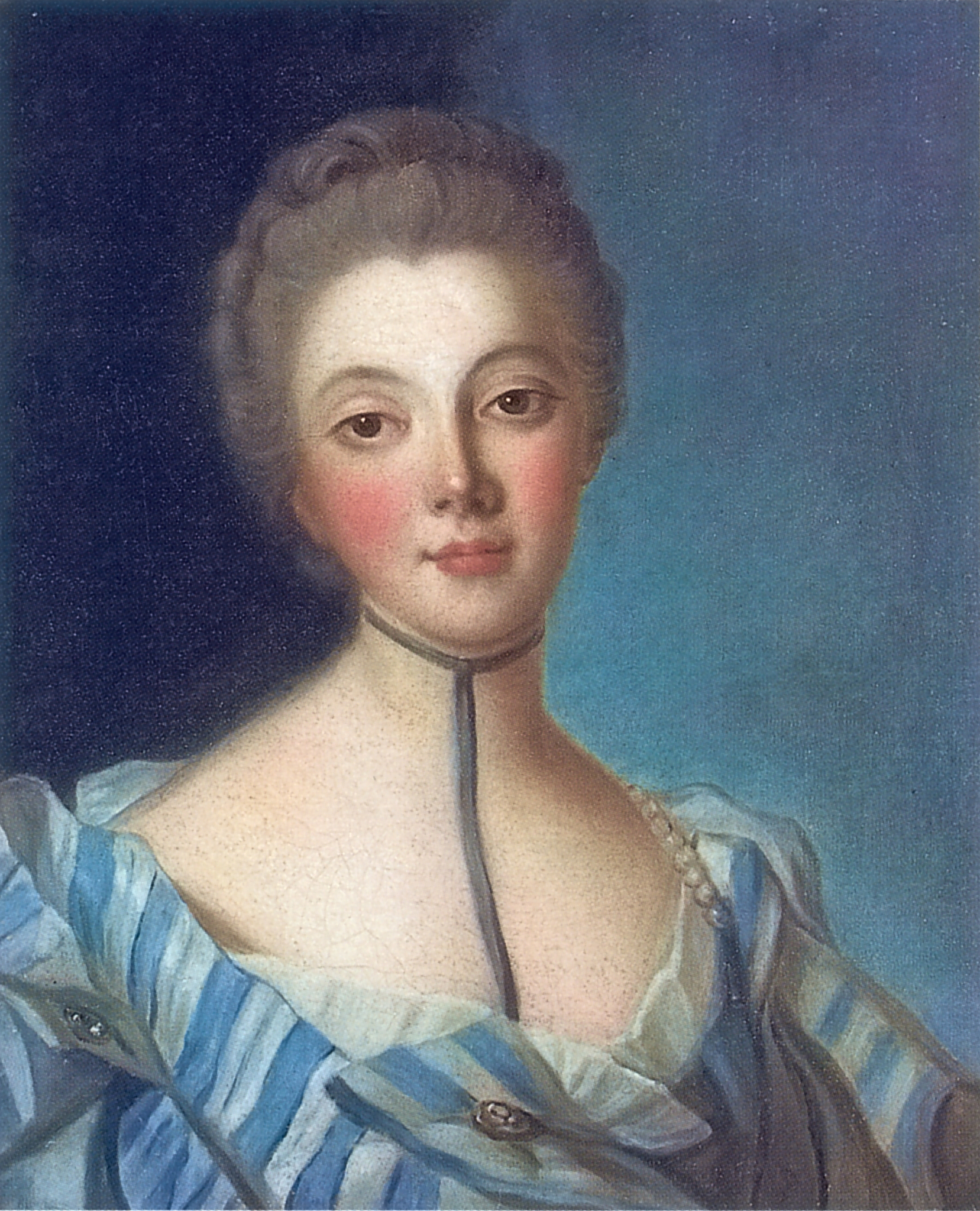

The portraits of Madame Dupin are rare. One of them previously showed in Chenonceau, on Madame Dupin's room, is now in a private collection. Was painted by Jean-Marc Nattier in collaboration with his daughter Catherine Pauline Nattier, the later wife of Louis Tocqué. The face, the flesh and the fabrics are of Nattier, the rest was painted by his daughter. A second version of this portrait exists, but unsigned, with a variant: Madame Dupin is represented with an American coot. Two other portraits are also painted by Nattier. One was for the boudoir of the Hôtel Lambert and currently is exposed to New York City in the private collection of Lawrence Steigrad fine arts. The other, a replica of the previous one, is painted for the château du Blanc. Another portrait is assumed also painted by Nattier and was in the hall of the second floor of the Hôtel Lambert. But his likeness with the previous one made his real authorship debatable. Would it be painted by Jean-Baptiste Greuze, author of a portrait of Madame Dupin who was listed in the catalog of his works; however, this question remains unsolved. Finally, the portrait of Madame Dupin currently on display at the Château de Chenonceau is made after the work of Jean-Marc Nattier.

=== Memory ===
- On Thursday 14 June 2012, a new type of rose was named the Rose Louise Dupin.
- On Thursday 16 May 2013, a conference of Monique Fouquet-Lapar on the theme: "Madame Dupin, a great lady of the 18th century forgotten", took place on the 1st arrondissement of Paris.
- On Wednesday 26 June 2013, a conference of Jean Buon took place in Tours, whose subject was "Madame Dupin, the Lady of Chenonceau: after the beautiful years, the dark years".

== Bibliography ==
- Louise Dupin (preface by Frédéric Marty), Éloge des reines de France (Praise of the queens of France), Paris, editions Payot & Rivages, coll. Petite Bibliothèque classiques, 6 March 2024, 144 p. online
- Angela Hunter and Rebecca Wilkin: Louise Dupin's Work on Women, Selections, Oxford, Oxford University Press Inc., coll. « Oxford New Histories of Philosophy », 20 July 2023, 344 p. online
- Louise Dupin (preface by Frédéric Marty), Des femmes: observations du préjugé commun sur la différence des sexes, Paris, Classiques Garnier, coll. 18th century library, 28 September 2022, 552 p. online
- Louise Dupin (preface by Frédéric Marty), Des femmes: discours préliminaire, Paris, editions Payot & Rivages, coll. Petite Bibliothèque classiques, 31 August 2022, 144 p. online
- Frédéric Marty, Louise Dupin: défendre l'égalité entre les sexes en 1750, Paris, Classiques Garnier, coll. L'Europe des Lumières, 27 January 2021, 344 p. online
- Jean Buon (preface by Michelle Perrot): Madame Dupin : Une féministe à Chenonceau au siècle des Lumières, Joué-lès-Tours, ed. La Simarre, 16 January 2014, 224 p. online
- Jean Buon: George Sand et Madame Dupin : son arrière grand-mère par alliance in: Les amis de George Sand, Tusson, nº 34: "George Sand et les arts du XVIII siècle", September 2012, pp. 187–204.
- Olivier Marchal: Rousseau : la comédie des masques, Paris, Éditions Gallimard, coll. "Folio" (nº 5404), 20 April 2012, 544 p., pp. 15–91. The first part of the novel concerns the relationship between Jean-Jacques Rousseau and Madame Dupin.
- Harumi Yamazaki-Jamin: À propos de Suzanne, Madame Dupin de Francueil, née Bollioud de Saint-Jullien (1718-1754), vol. 49: Annales de la Société Jean-Jacques Rousseau, Geneva, ed. Droz, 2010, 427 p., pp. 283–298.
- Claude Hartmann: Charles-Hélion, marquis de Barbançois-Villegongis (1760-1822) : un noble éclairé du Bas-Berry. Agronome, amateur de science et de philosophie, ed. L'Harmattan, coll. "Logiques Historiques", 14 June 2007, 114 p., "Le domaine de Villegongis", pp. 37–42 (Familles Dupin et Fontaine).
- Christiane Gil: Les Dames de Chenonceau, Paris, ed. Pygmalion, coll. "Les grandes dames de l'histoire", 18 September 2003, 192 p., "Louise Dupin, une femme de cœur et d'esprit au siècle des Lumières", pp. 123–144.
- Axelle de Gaigneron (preface by Alain Decaux): Connaissance des Arts : Chenonceaux, vol. 37 : Hors-série, Paris, Société française de promotion artistique, April–June 1993, 68 p., "Louise Dupin (1706-1799)", pp. 20–22.
- Michel Laurencin (illustrations by Georges Pons): Dictionnaire biographique de Touraine, Chambray-lès-Tours, Éditions C.L.D., 1990, 632 p. (BNF nº FRBNF35287344).
- Lucienne Chaubin, Marie-Josèphe Duaux-Giraud, Chantal Delavau-Labrux: Le Blanc : vingt siècles d'histoire, Le Blanc, ed. de l'Office municipal de la culture, des arts, des loisirs et Éditions Royer, coll. "Archives d'histoire locale", 1 January 1983, 206 p., "Les Dupin au Blanc", pp. 171–173.
- Robert Ranjard: Le secret de Chenonceau, Tours, ed. Gibert-Clarey, 8 June 1976 (1st ed. 1950), 256 p., "Monsieur et madame Dupin", pp. 177–210.
- Chantal de la Véronne: Histoire du Blanc : des origines à la Révolution de 1789, t. VI, Poitiers, ed. Mémoires de la société des antiquaires de l'Ouest (nº 4), 1962 (reprint. 2012 by ed. Alice Lyner), 234 p., pp. 40–42.
- François-Auguste Fauveau de Frenilly (preface by. Arthur Chuqet): Souvenirs du baron de Frenilly : Pair de France (1768-1828), Paris, ed. Plon, 1909, 584 p. online, chap. V: "Chenonceaux et Madame Dupin", pp. 177–179.
- Paul Triaire (preface by Léon Lereboullet): Bretonneau et ses correspondants : ouvrage comprenant la correspondance de Trousseau et de Velpeau avec Bretonneau, vol. 1, Paris, ed. Félix Alcan, 14 May 1892, 618 p. (BNF nº FRBNF30159684) online "Biographie de Bretonneau (Pierre Bretonneau et Madame Dupin)", pp. 27–40 in the website of Bibliothèque interuniversitaire de santé.
- Gaston de Villeneuve-Guibert: Le portefeuille de madame Dupin : Dame de Chenonceaux, Paris, ed. Calmann-Lévy, 20 January 1884, 606 p. online.
- George Sand: Histoire de ma vie, vol. I, Paris, ed. Michel Lévy Frères, 15 April 1847 (1st ed. 1856), 274 p. online, chap. 2: "Madame Dupin de Chenonceaux", pp. 61–71.
- Nicolas François Bellart (preface by Bergeron-D'Anguy): Œuvres de N. F. Bellart : Procureur-général à la cour royale de Paris, vol. 1, Paris, J. L. J. Brière libraire-éditeur, February 1827, 484 p. online, "Plaidoyer pour la famille Dupin contre la tutrice de la mineure Saint-Aubin", pp. 383–428.
- Jean-Jacques Rousseau: Les Confessions de Jean-Jacques Rousseau, vol. 1 (2nd part), Paris, 18th century, 182 p. online online, chap. VII: "Madame Dupin", pp. 151–152 (Paris) and 177-178 (Chenonceau).
- Barthélemy François Joseph Mouffle D'Angerville: Vie Privée de Louis XV : ou principaux événements, particularités et anecdotes de son règne, vol. 1, London, ed. John Peter Lyton, 1 December 1780 (reprinted in 1796 under the title of Siècle de Louis XV) (1st ed. 1781), 398 p. online, chap. XXXIII, pp. 288–290.
