= Chasseneuil =

- Commune
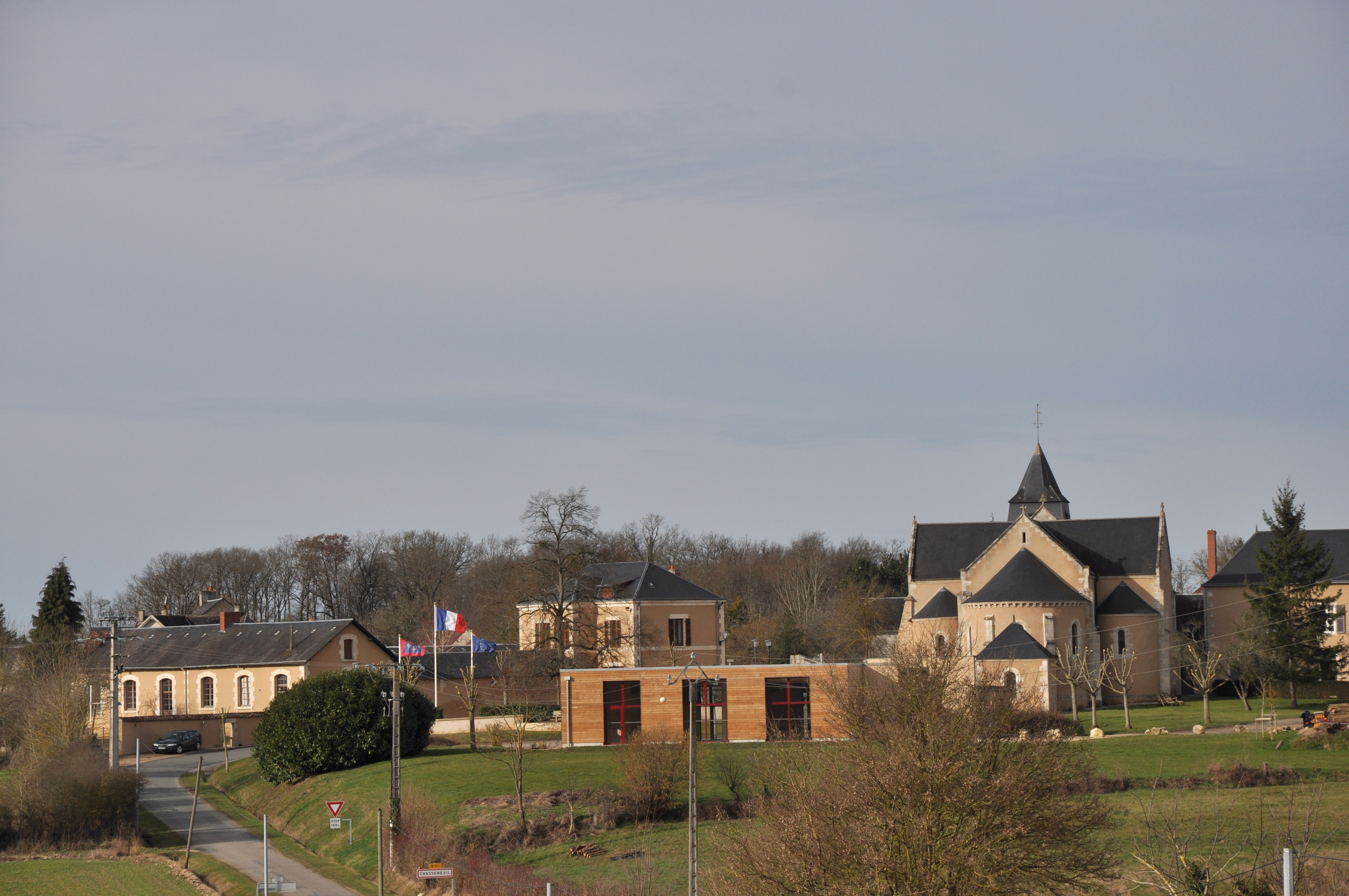
- A general view of Chasseneuil
- Location of Chasseneuil
- Location within France Location within Centre-Val de Loire
- Coordinates: 46°38′52″N 1°29′43″E
- Country: France
- Region: Centre-Val de Loire
- Department: Indre
- Arrondissement: Châteauroux
- Canton: Argenton-sur-Creuse

Government
  - Mayor (2020–2026): Claude Dauzier
- Area^{1}: 29.85 km^{2} (11.53 sq mi)
- Highest elevation: 177 m (581 ft)
- Lowest elevation: 93 m (305 ft)
- Population (2023): 714
  - Density: 23.9/km^{2} (62.0/sq mi)
- Time zone: UTC+01:00 (CET)
  - Summer (DST): UTC+02:00 (CEST)
- INSEE/Postal code: 36042 /36800
- ^{1} French Land Register data, which excludes lakes, ponds, glaciers > 1 km^{2} (0.386 sq mi or 247 acres) and river estuaries.

Chasseneuil (French pronunciation: [ʃasnœj]) is a commune in the Indre department in central France.

== Population ==
Historical population
Year	Pop.	±% p.a.
1968	683	—
1975	594	−1.97%
1982	573	−0.51%
1990	580	+0.15%
1999	620	+0.74%
2007	653	+0.65%
2012	684	+0.93%
2017	702	+0.52%
2023	714	+0.28%
Source: INSEE

== See also ==
- Communes of the Indre department
