= Pommiers, Indre =

Pommiers
- Commune
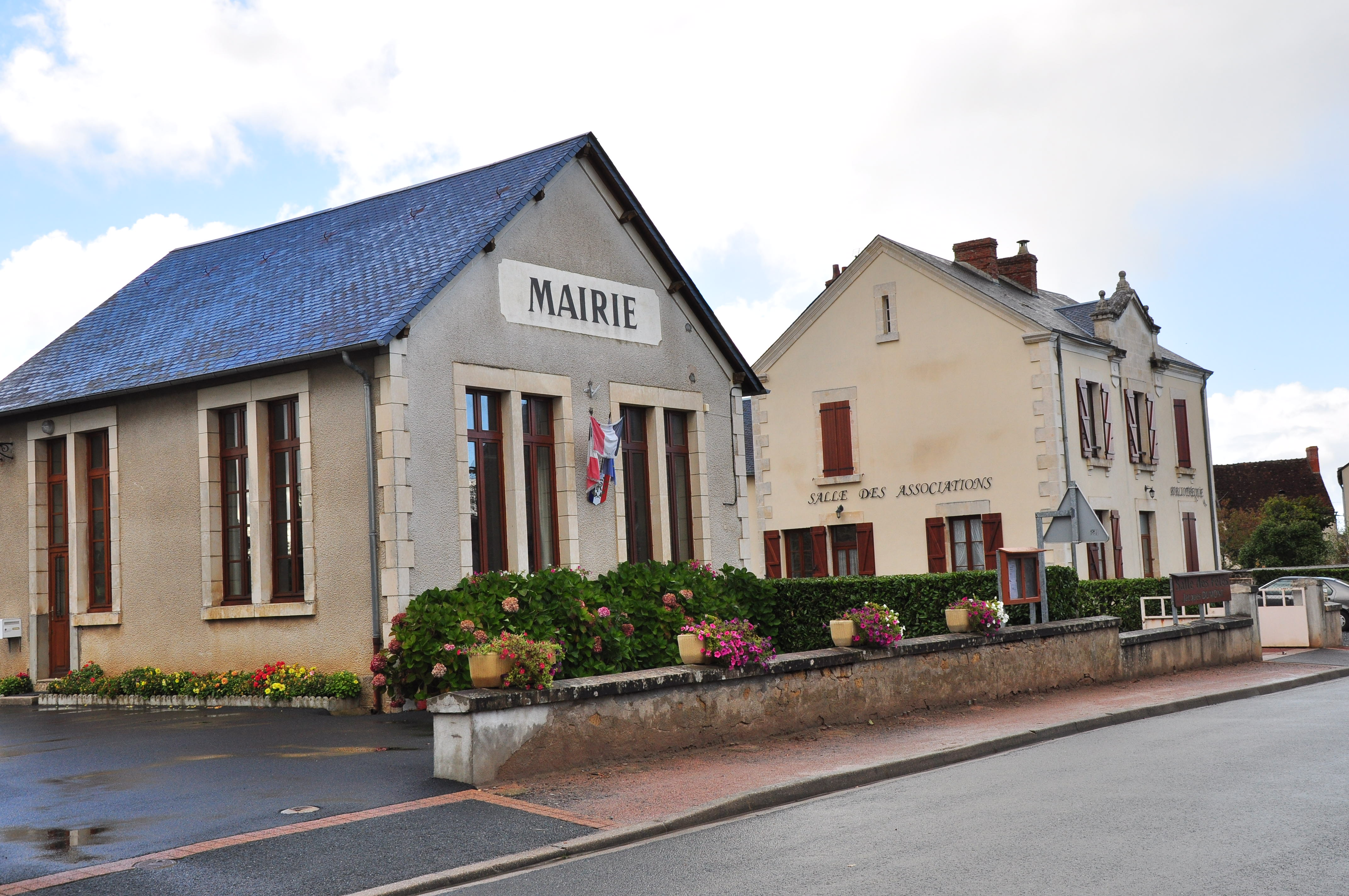
- Town hall
- Location of Pommiers
- Location within France Location within Centre-Val de Loire
- Coordinates: 46°31′19″N 1°39′12″E
- Country: France
- Region: Centre-Val de Loire
- Department: Indre
- Arrondissement: Châteauroux
- Canton: Argenton-sur-Creuse

Government
  - Mayor (2020–2026): Alain Gourinat
- Area^{1}: 12.19 km^{2} (4.71 sq mi)
- Elevation: 250 m (820 ft)
- Highest elevation: 280 m (920 ft)
- Lowest elevation: 196 m (643 ft)
- Population (2023): 237
  - Density: 19.4/km^{2} (50.4/sq mi)
- Time zone: UTC+01:00 (CET)
  - Summer (DST): UTC+02:00 (CEST)
- INSEE/Postal code: 36160 /36190
- ^{1} French Land Register data, which excludes lakes, ponds, glaciers > 1 km^{2} (0.386 sq mi or 247 acres) and river estuaries.

Pommiers (French pronunciation: [pɔmje]) is a commune in the Indre department in central France.

== Population ==
Historical population
Year	Pop.	±% p.a.
1968	405	—
1975	367	−1.40%
1982	322	−1.85%
1990	279	−1.78%
1999	268	−0.45%
2007	270	+0.09%
2012	274	+0.29%
2017	224	−3.95%
2023	237	+0.94%
Source: INSEE

== See also ==
- Communes of the Indre department
