= Ceaulmont =

- Commune
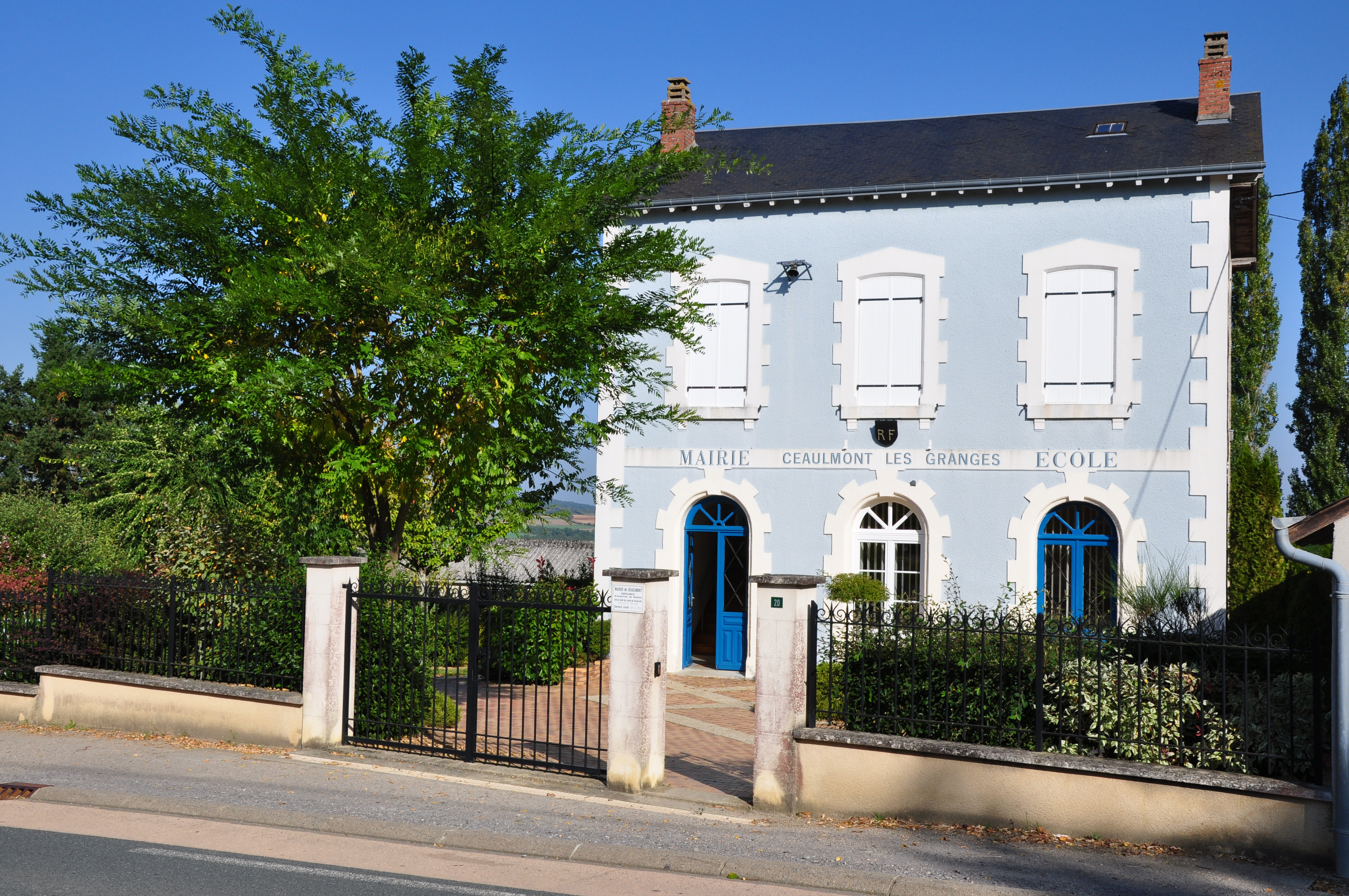
- The town hall in Ceaulmont
- Location of Ceaulmont
- Location within France Location within Centre-Val de Loire
- Coordinates: 46°31′56″N 1°33′12″E
- Country: France
- Region: Centre-Val de Loire
- Department: Indre
- Arrondissement: Châteauroux
- Canton: Argenton-sur-Creuse

Government
  - Mayor (2026–32): Anne-Laure Bodin
- Area^{1}: 17.38 km^{2} (6.71 sq mi)
- Elevation: 197 m (646 ft)
- Highest elevation: 266 m (873 ft)
- Lowest elevation: 104 m (341 ft)
- Population (2023): 670
  - Density: 39/km^{2} (100/sq mi)
- Time zone: UTC+01:00 (CET)
  - Summer (DST): UTC+02:00 (CEST)
- INSEE/Postal code: 36032 /36200
- ^{1} French Land Register data, which excludes lakes, ponds, glaciers > 1 km^{2} (0.386 sq mi or 247 acres) and river estuaries.

Ceaulmont (French pronunciation: [solmɔ̃]) is a commune in the Indre department in central France.

== Population ==
Historical population
Year	Pop.	±% p.a.
1968	603	—
1975	579	−0.58%
1982	628	+1.17%
1990	621	−0.14%
1999	651	+0.53%
2007	708	+1.05%
2012	741	+0.92%
2017	727	−0.38%
2023	670	−1.35%
Source: INSEE

== See also ==
- Communes of the Indre department
