= Bouesse =

- Commune
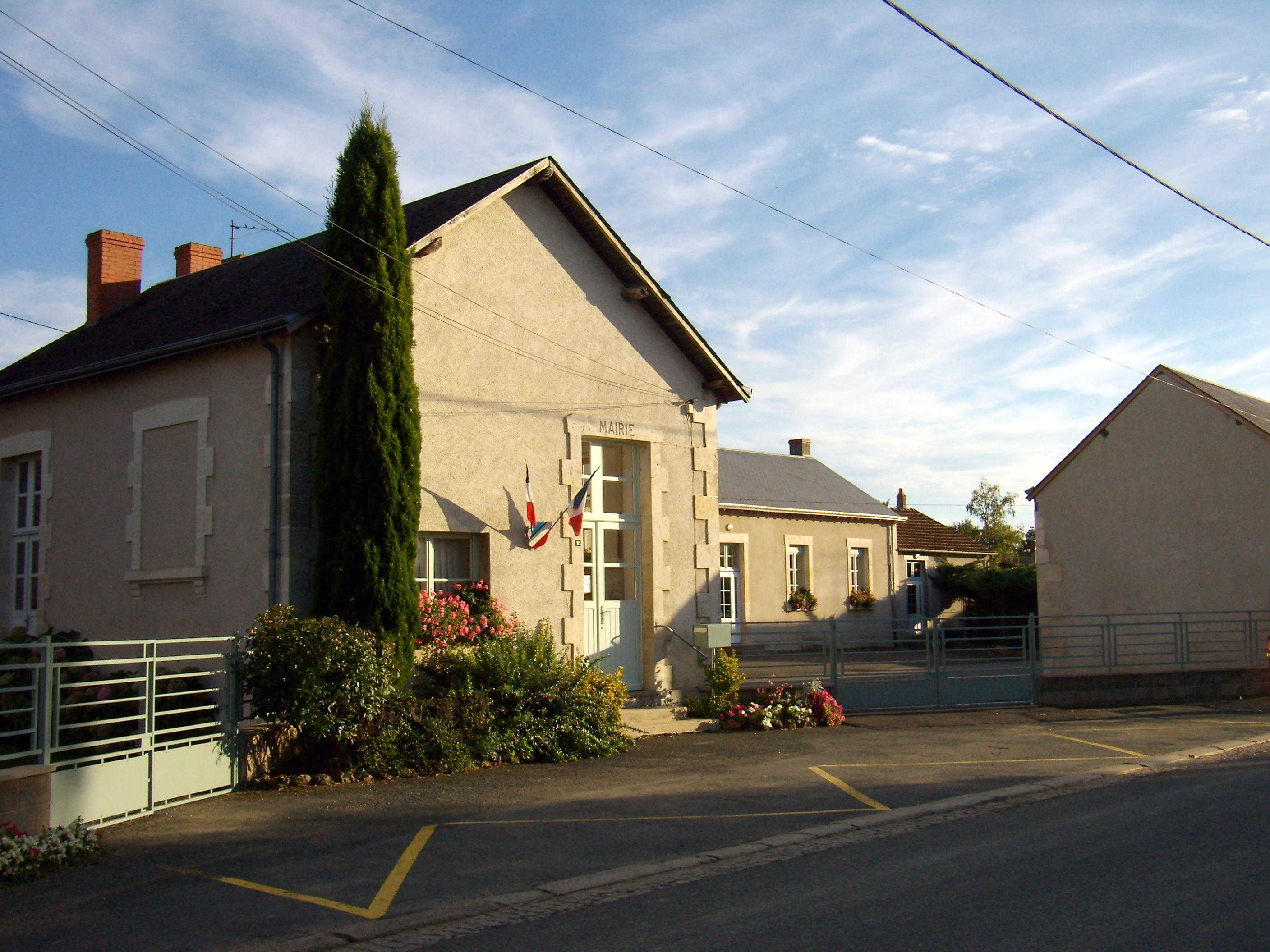
- The town hall in Bouesse

- Coat of arms
- Location of Bouesse
- Location within France Location within Centre-Val de Loire
- Coordinates: 46°37′01″N 1°41′19″E
- Country: France
- Region: Centre-Val de Loire
- Department: Indre
- Arrondissement: Châteauroux
- Canton: Argenton-sur-Creuse

Government
  - Mayor (2022–2026): Claudette Ballereau
- Area^{1}: 24.19 km^{2} (9.34 sq mi)
- Elevation: 186 m (610 ft)
- Highest elevation: 242 m (794 ft)
- Lowest elevation: 144 m (472 ft)
- Population (2023): 381
  - Density: 15.8/km^{2} (40.8/sq mi)
- Time zone: UTC+01:00 (CET)
  - Summer (DST): UTC+02:00 (CEST)
- INSEE/Postal code: 36022 /36200
- ^{1} French Land Register data, which excludes lakes, ponds, glaciers > 1 km^{2} (0.386 sq mi or 247 acres) and river estuaries.

Bouesse (French pronunciation: [bwɛs]) is a commune in the Indre department in central France.

== Population ==
Historical population
Year	Pop.	±% p.a.
1968	465	—
1975	416	−1.58%
1982	430	+0.47%
1990	416	−0.41%
1999	398	−0.49%
2007	395	−0.09%
2012	372	−1.19%
2017	439	+3.37%
2023	381	−2.33%
Source: INSEE

== See also ==
- Communes of the Indre department
