= Chenonceaux =

- Commune
- Chenonceau Château and the Cher River

- Coat of arms
- Location of Chenonceaux
- Location within France Location within Centre-Val de Loire
- Coordinates: 47°19′59″N 1°04′09″E
- Country: France
- Region: Centre-Val de Loire
- Department: Indre-et-Loire
- Arrondissement: Loches
- Canton: Bléré

Government
  - Mayor (2021–2026): Pierre Poupeau
- Area^{1}: 4.33 km^{2} (1.67 sq mi)
- Highest elevation: 129 m (423 ft)
- Lowest elevation: 54 m (177 ft)
- Population (2023): 334
  - Density: 77.1/km^{2} (200/sq mi)
- Time zone: UTC+01:00 (CET)
  - Summer (DST): UTC+02:00 (CEST)
- INSEE/Postal code: 37070 /37150
- ^{1} French Land Register data, which excludes lakes, ponds, glaciers > 1 km^{2} (0.386 sq mi or 247 acres) and river estuaries.

Chenonceaux (French pronunciation: [ʃənɔ̃so]) is a commune in the French department of Indre-et-Loire, and the region of Centre-Val de Loire, France.

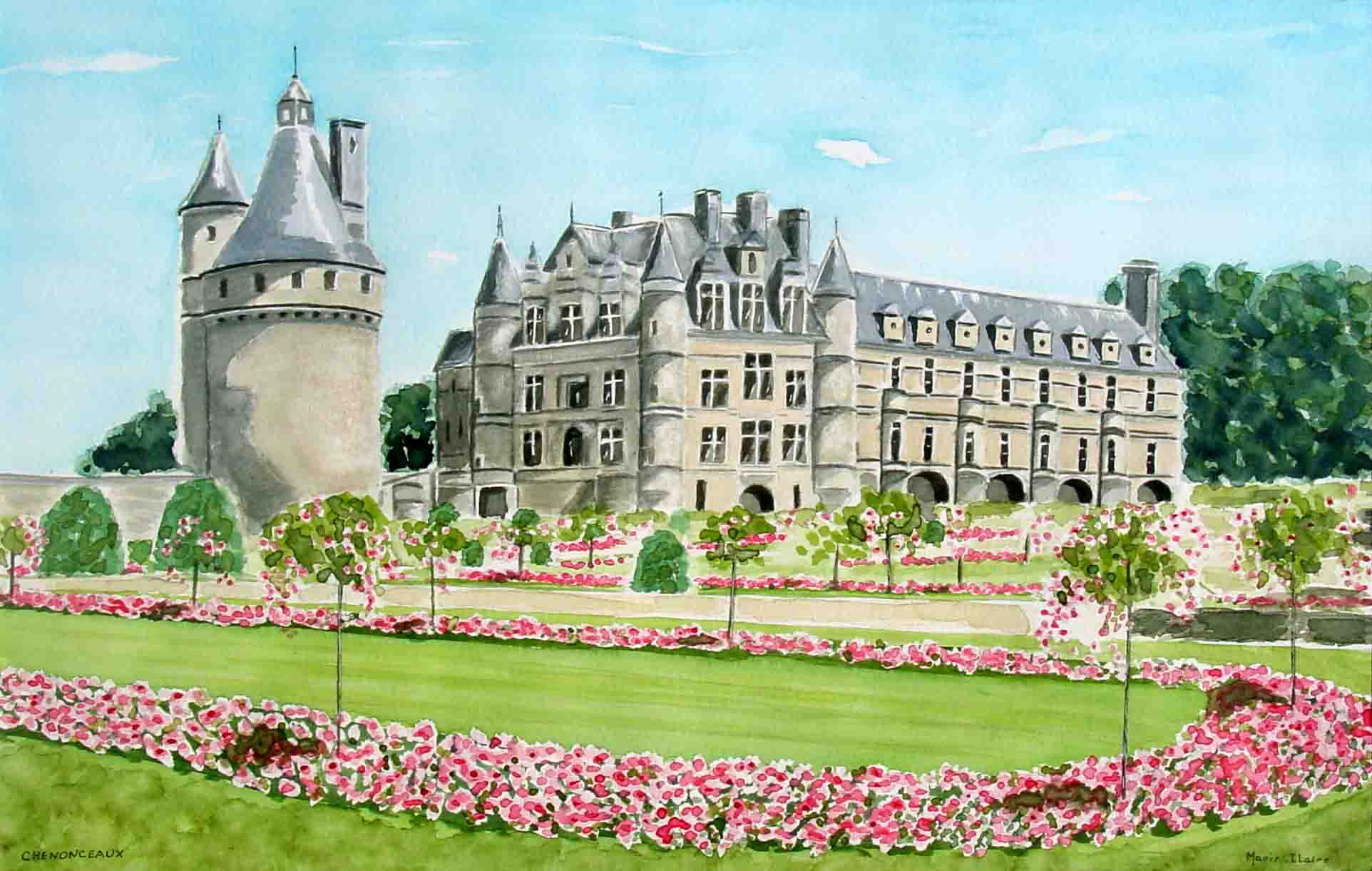
The castle and its flower gardens.

It is situated in the valley of the river Cher, a tributary of the Loire, about 26 km (16 mi) east of Tours and on the right bank of the Cher.

The population of permanent residents hovers about 350, but there is a large influx of tourists during the summer months because the village adjoins the former royal Château de Chenonceau, one of the most popular tourist destinations in France. The château is distinctive in being built across the river. The village is also situated in Touraine-Chenonceaux wine-growing area, and bordered on its northern edge by the Forest of Amboise.

== Name ==
The difference in spelling between the Château's name (Chenonceau) and the village (Chenonceaux) is attributed to Louise Dupin de Francueil, owner of the château during the French Revolution, who is said to have dropped the "x" at the end of its name to differentiate what was a symbol of royalty from the Republic. As a result of her good relations with the village, the Château was spared the iconoclastic damage suffered by many other monuments during the Revolution. Although no official sources have been found to support this claim, the Château has ever since been referred to and spelled as Chenonceau.

Mme Dupin hosted the philosopher Jean-Jacques Rousseau in Chenonceau as tutor to her children, and among her descendants was the writer George Sand, born Aurore Dupin.

== Population ==
Historical population
Year	Pop.	±% p.a.
1968	308	—
1975	316	+0.37%
1982	361	+1.92%
1990	313	−1.77%
1999	325	+0.42%
2007	351	+0.97%
2012	360	+0.51%
2017	351	−0.51%
2023	334	−0.82%
Source: INSEE

== See also ==
- Communes of the Indre-et-Loire department
