= Le Pêchereau =

- Commune
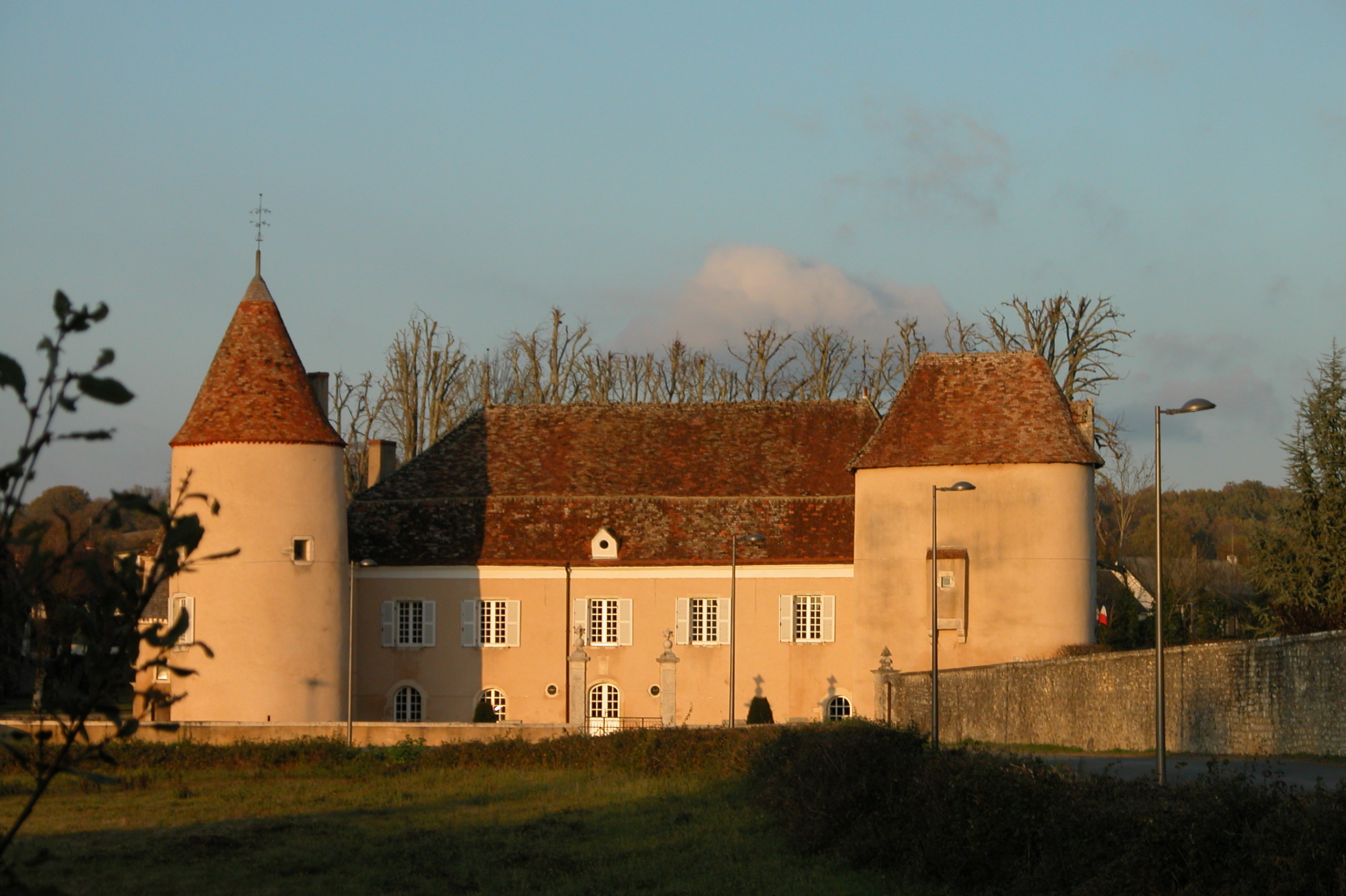
- The Château du Courbat, the town hall in Le Pêchereau

- Coat of arms
- Location of Le Pêchereau
- Location within France Location within Centre-Val de Loire
- Coordinates: 46°34′44″N 1°32′54″E
- Country: France
- Region: Centre-Val de Loire
- Department: Indre
- Arrondissement: Châteauroux
- Canton: Argenton-sur-Creuse

Government
  - Mayor (2020–2026): Jean-Pierre Nandillon
- Area^{1}: 20.94 km^{2} (8.08 sq mi)
- Elevation: 110 m (360 ft)
- Highest elevation: 256 m (840 ft)
- Lowest elevation: 103 m (338 ft)
- Population (2023): 1,744
  - Density: 83.29/km^{2} (215.7/sq mi)
- Time zone: UTC+01:00 (CET)
  - Summer (DST): UTC+02:00 (CEST)
- INSEE/Postal code: 36154 /36200
- ^{1} French Land Register data, which excludes lakes, ponds, glaciers > 1 km^{2} (0.386 sq mi or 247 acres) and river estuaries.

Le Pêchereau (French pronunciation: [lə pɛʃʁo]) is a commune in the Indre department in central France.

== Population ==
Historical population
Year	Pop.	±% p.a.
1968	1,239	—
1975	1,335	+1.07%
1982	1,726	+3.74%
1990	1,887	+1.12%
1999	1,884	−0.02%
2007	2,002	+0.76%
2012	1,892	−1.12%
2017	1,863	−0.31%
2023	1,744	−1.09%
Source: INSEE

== See also ==
- Communes of the Indre department
