= Cuzion =

- Commune
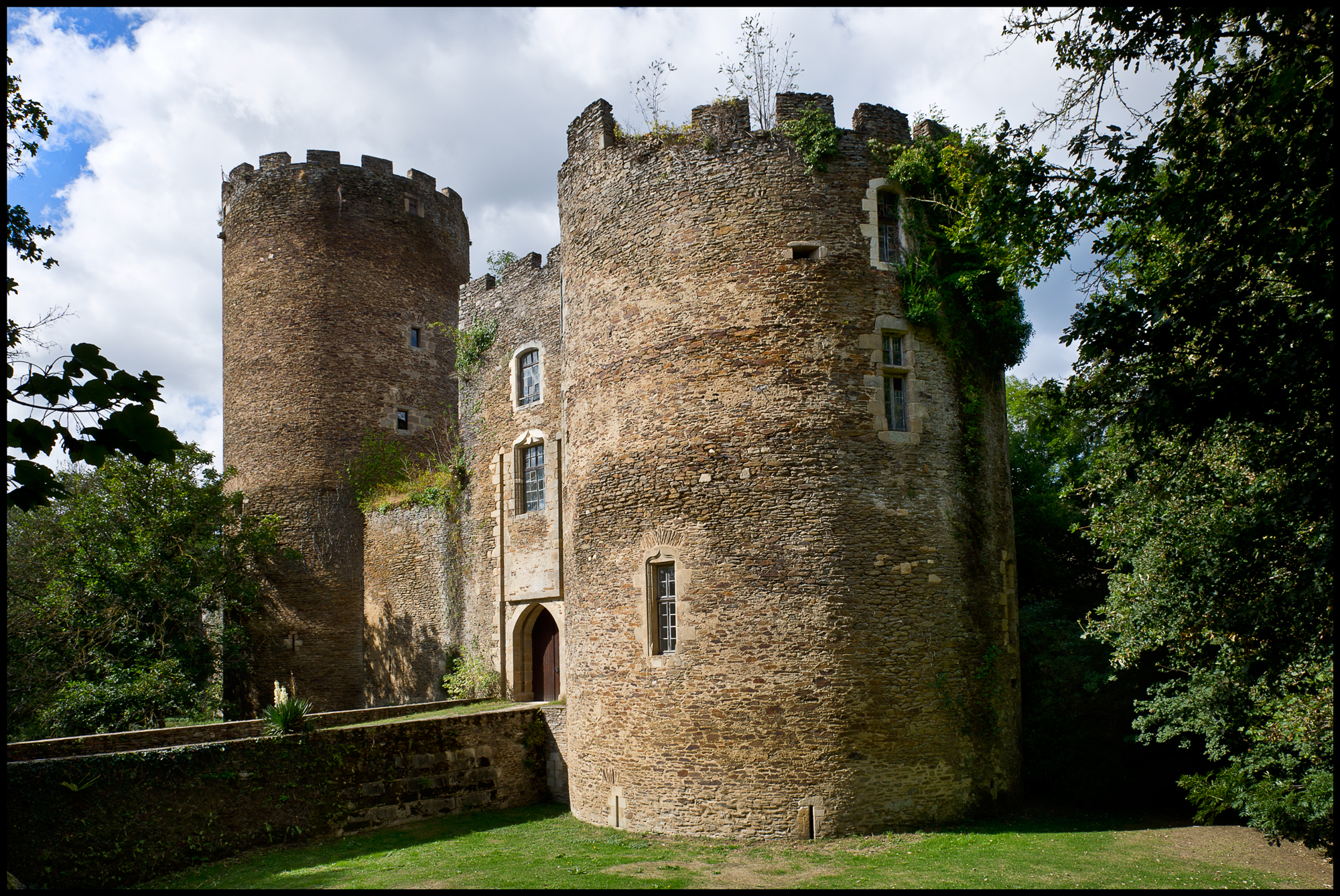
- Chateau of Châteaubrun
- Location of Cuzion
- Location within France Location within Centre-Val de Loire
- Coordinates: 46°28′47″N 1°36′27″E
- Country: France
- Region: Centre-Val de Loire
- Department: Indre
- Arrondissement: Châteauroux
- Canton: Argenton-sur-Creuse
- Intercommunality: Éguzon-Argenton-Vallée de la Creuse

Government
  - Mayor (2020–2026): André Guilbaud
- Area^{1}: 18.45 km^{2} (7.12 sq mi)
- Elevation: 270 m (890 ft)
- Highest elevation: 287 m (942 ft)
- Lowest elevation: 135 m (443 ft)
- Population (2023): 476
  - Density: 25.8/km^{2} (66.8/sq mi)
- Time zone: UTC+01:00 (CET)
  - Summer (DST): UTC+02:00 (CEST)
- INSEE/Postal code: 36062 /36190
- ^{1} French Land Register data, which excludes lakes, ponds, glaciers > 1 km^{2} (0.386 sq mi or 247 acres) and river estuaries.

Cuzion (French pronunciation: [kyzjɔ̃]) is a commune in the Indre department in central France.

== Population ==
Historical population
| Year | Pop. | ±% p.a. |
|---|---|---|
| 1968 | 757 | — |
| 1975 | 618 | −2.86% |
| 1982 | 562 | −1.35% |
| 1990 | 524 | −0.87% |
| 1999 | 504 | −0.43% |
| 2007 | 461 | −1.11% |
| 2012 | 442 | −0.84% |
| 2017 | 441 | −0.05% |
| 2023 | 476 | +1.28% |
Source: INSEE

== See also ==
- Communes of the Indre department
