= Le Menoux =

- Commune
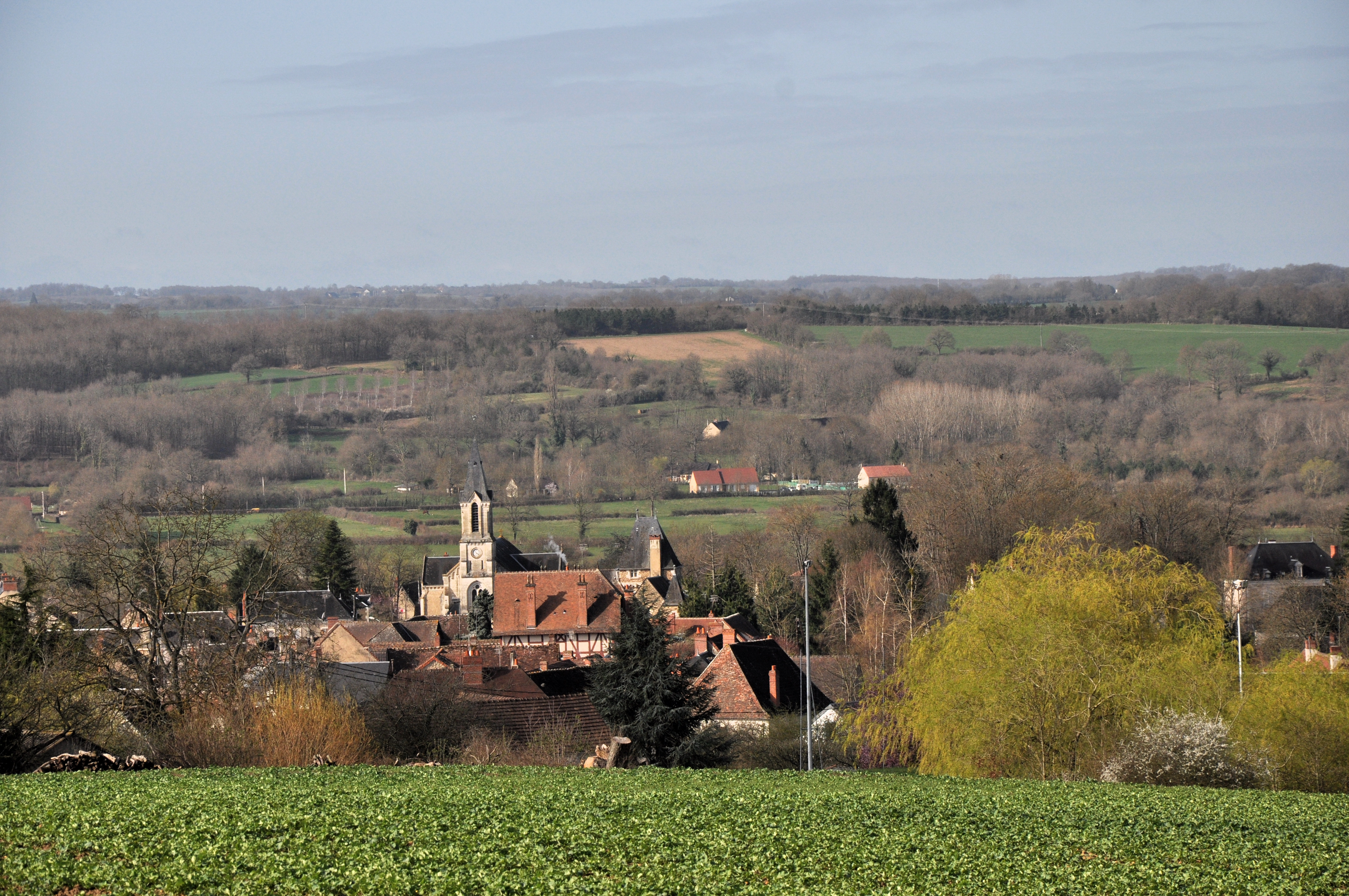
- A general view of Le Menoux
- Location of Le Menoux
- Location within France Location within Centre-Val de Loire
- Coordinates: 46°33′19″N 1°34′14″E
- Country: France
- Region: Centre-Val de Loire
- Department: Indre
- Arrondissement: Châteauroux
- Canton: Argenton-sur-Creuse

Government
  - Mayor (2020–2026): Chantal Larue-Ricot
- Area^{1}: 5.58 km^{2} (2.15 sq mi)
- Elevation: 160 m (520 ft)
- Highest elevation: 267 m (876 ft)
- Lowest elevation: 108 m (354 ft)
- Population (2023): 401
  - Density: 71.9/km^{2} (186/sq mi)
- Time zone: UTC+01:00 (CET)
  - Summer (DST): UTC+02:00 (CEST)
- INSEE/Postal code: 36117 /36200
- ^{1} French Land Register data, which excludes lakes, ponds, glaciers > 1 km^{2} (0.386 sq mi or 247 acres) and river estuaries.

Le Menoux (French pronunciation: [lə mənu]) is a commune in the Indre department in central France.

== Population ==
Historical population
Year	Pop.	±% p.a.
1968	446	—
1975	424	−0.72%
1982	434	+0.33%
1990	425	−0.26%
1999	420	−0.13%
2007	446	+0.75%
2012	444	−0.09%
2017	430	−0.64%
2023	401	−1.16%
Source: INSEE

== See also ==
- Communes of the Indre department
