= Badecon-le-Pin =

- Commune
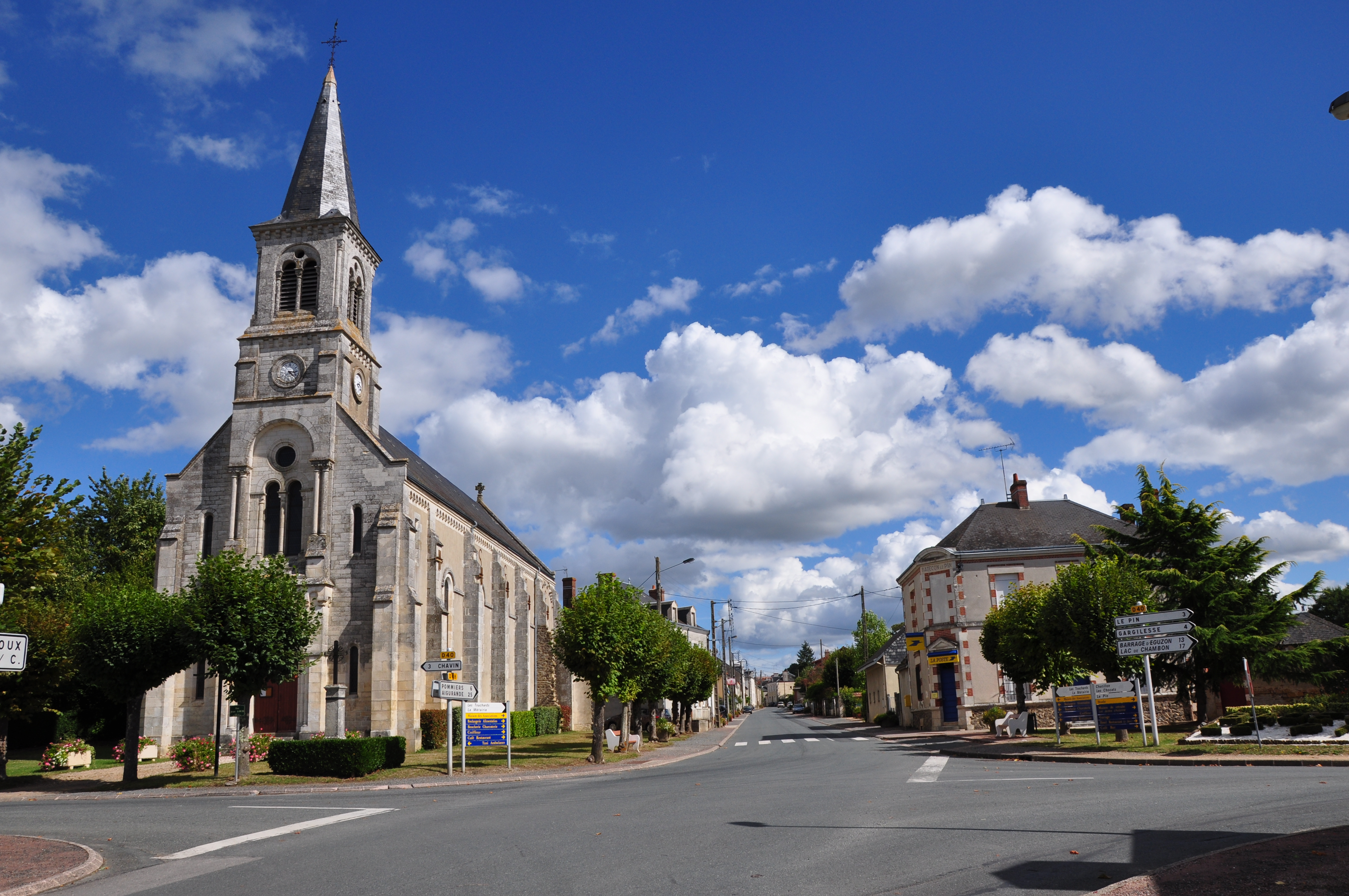
- The church and the main road in Badecon-le-Pin
- Location of Badecon-le-Pin
- Location within France Location within Centre-Val de Loire
- Coordinates: 46°32′28″N 1°35′34″E
- Country: France
- Region: Centre-Val de Loire
- Department: Indre
- Arrondissement: Châteauroux
- Canton: Argenton-sur-Creuse

Government
  - Mayor (2020–2026): François Broggi
- Area^{1}: 9.88 km^{2} (3.81 sq mi)
- Elevation: 200 m (660 ft)
- Highest elevation: 259 m (850 ft)
- Lowest elevation: 111 m (364 ft)
- Population (2023): 748
  - Density: 75.7/km^{2} (196/sq mi)
- Time zone: UTC+01:00 (CET)
  - Summer (DST): UTC+02:00 (CEST)
- INSEE/Postal code: 36158 /36200
- ^{1} French Land Register data, which excludes lakes, ponds, glaciers > 1 km^{2} (0.386 sq mi or 247 acres) and river estuaries.

Badecon-le-Pin (French pronunciation: [badkɔ̃ lə pɛ̃]) is a commune in the Indre département in central France.

== Population ==
Historical population
Year	Pop.	±% p.a.
1968	578	—
1975	596	+0.44%
1982	523	−1.85%
1990	595	+1.63%
1999	696	+1.76%
2007	729	+0.58%
2012	751	+0.60%
2017	751	+0.00%
2023	748	−0.07%
Source: INSEE

== See also ==
- Communes of the Indre department
