= Canton of Argenton-sur-Creuse =

Coordinates: 46.59°N 1.52°E

The canton of Argenton-sur-Creuse is an administrative division of the Indre department, central France. Its borders were modified at the French canton reorganisation which came into effect in March 2015. Its seat is in Argenton-sur-Creuse.

It consists of the following communes:

1. Argenton-sur-Creuse
2. Badecon-le-Pin
3. Baraize
4. Bazaiges
5. Bouesse
6. Ceaulmont
7. Celon
8. Chasseneuil
9. Chavin
10. Cuzion
11. Éguzon-Chantôme
12. Gargilesse-Dampierre
13. Le Menoux
14. Mosnay
15. Le Pêchereau
16. Pommiers
17. Le Pont-Chrétien-Chabenet
18. Saint-Marcel
19. Tendu
20. Velles
