= Baraize =

- Commune
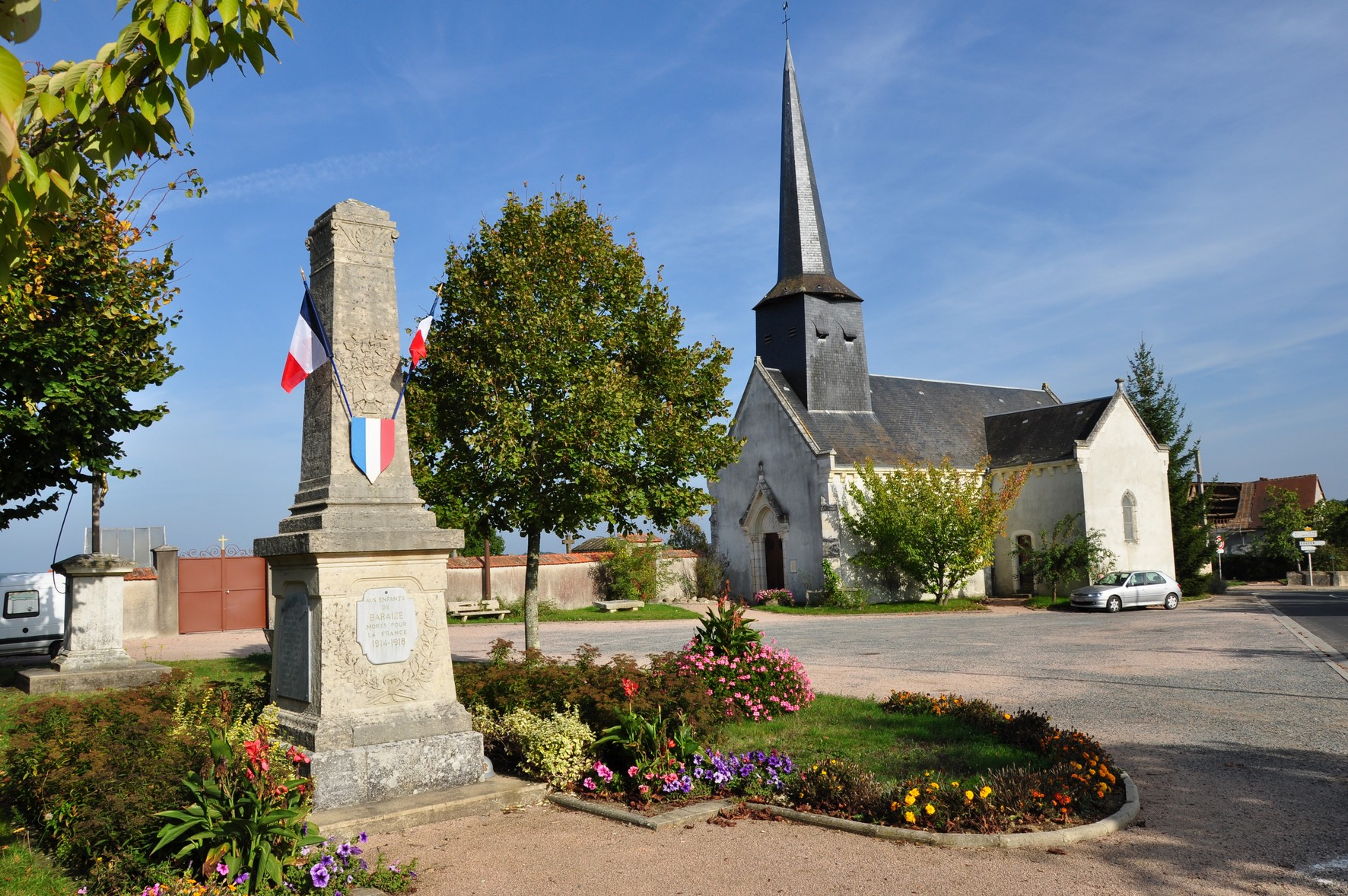
- The church and war memorial in Baraize
- Location of Baraize
- Location within France Location within Centre-Val de Loire
- Coordinates: 46°29′22″N 1°33′45″E
- Country: France
- Region: Centre-Val de Loire
- Department: Indre
- Arrondissement: Châteauroux
- Canton: Argenton-sur-Creuse

Government
  - Mayor (2020–2026): Lionnel Perrot
- Area^{1}: 16.39 km^{2} (6.33 sq mi)
- Elevation: 244 m (801 ft)
- Highest elevation: 292 m (958 ft)
- Lowest elevation: 123 m (404 ft)
- Population (2023): 352
  - Density: 21.5/km^{2} (55.6/sq mi)
- Time zone: UTC+01:00 (CET)
  - Summer (DST): UTC+02:00 (CEST)
- INSEE/Postal code: 36012 /36270
- ^{1} French Land Register data, which excludes lakes, ponds, glaciers > 1 km^{2} (0.386 sq mi or 247 acres) and river estuaries.

Baraize (French pronunciation: [baʁɛz]) is a commune in the Indre département in central France.

== Population ==
Historical population
Year	Pop.	±% p.a.
1968	389	—
1975	417	+1.00%
1982	404	−0.45%
1990	337	−2.24%
1999	301	−1.25%
2007	315	+0.57%
2012	331	+1.00%
2017	351	+1.18%
2023	352	+0.05%
Source: INSEE

== See also ==
- Communes of the Indre department
