= Chavin, Indre =

Chavin
- Commune
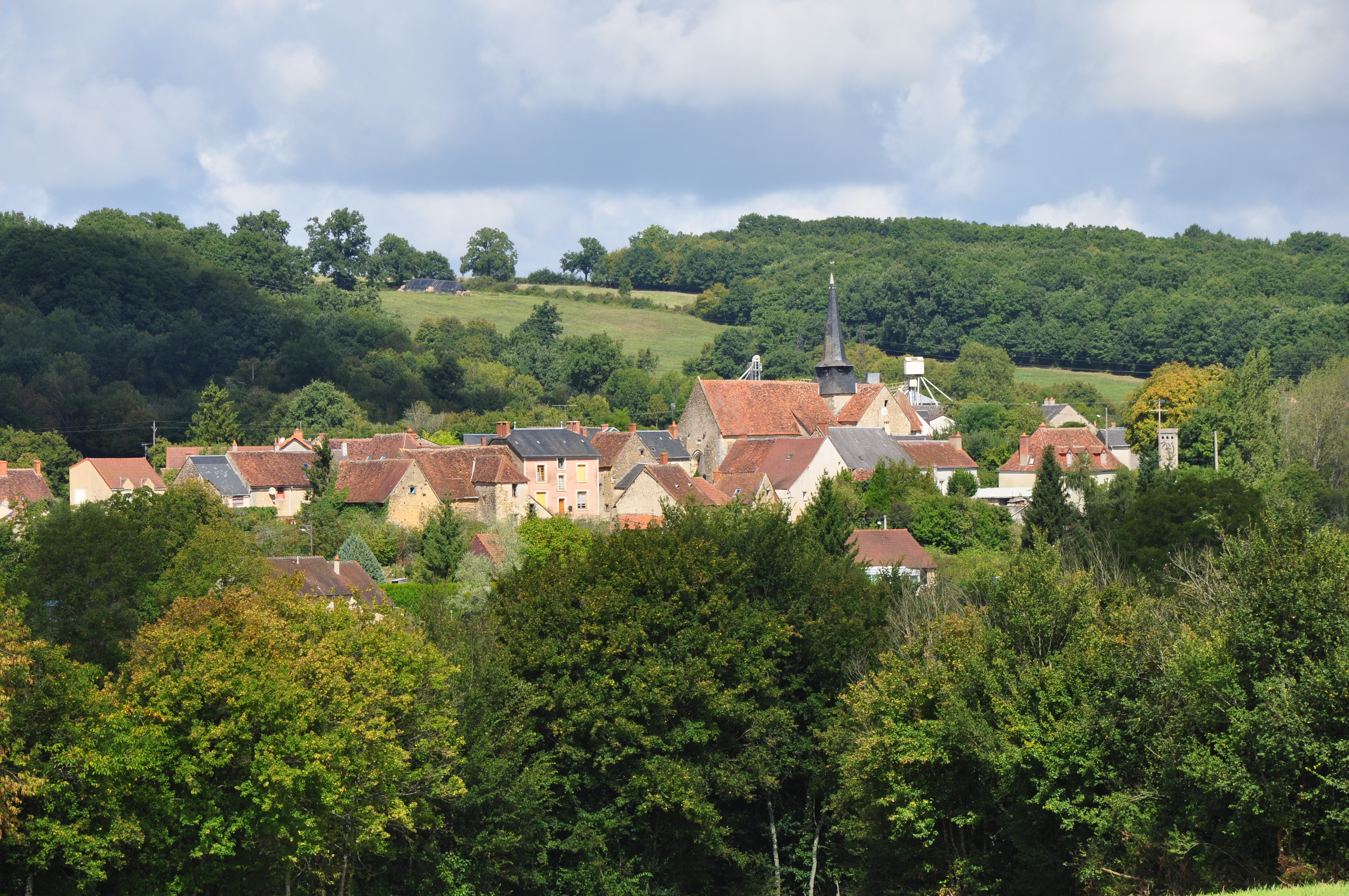
- A general view of Chavin
- Location of Chavin
- Location within France Location within Centre-Val de Loire
- Coordinates: 46°33′43″N 1°36′42″E
- Country: France
- Region: Centre-Val de Loire
- Department: Indre
- Arrondissement: Châteauroux
- Canton: Argenton-sur-Creuse

Government
  - Mayor (2020–2026): Jean-Pierre Grelet
- Area^{1}: 14.01 km^{2} (5.41 sq mi)
- Elevation: 155 m (509 ft)
- Highest elevation: 276 m (906 ft)
- Lowest elevation: 154 m (505 ft)
- Population (2023): 270
  - Density: 19/km^{2} (50/sq mi)
- Time zone: UTC+01:00 (CET)
  - Summer (DST): UTC+02:00 (CEST)
- INSEE/Postal code: 36048 /36200
- ^{1} French Land Register data, which excludes lakes, ponds, glaciers > 1 km^{2} (0.386 sq mi or 247 acres) and river estuaries.

Chavin (French pronunciation: [ʃavɛ̃]) is a commune in the Indre department in central France.

== Population ==
Historical population
Year	Pop.	±% p.a.
1968	335	—
1975	311	−1.06%
1982	292	−0.90%
1990	288	−0.17%
1999	301	+0.49%
2007	292	−0.38%
2012	278	−0.98%
2017	271	−0.51%
2023	270	−0.06%
Source: INSEE

== See also ==
- Communes of the Indre department
