= Celon, Indre =

Celon
- Commune
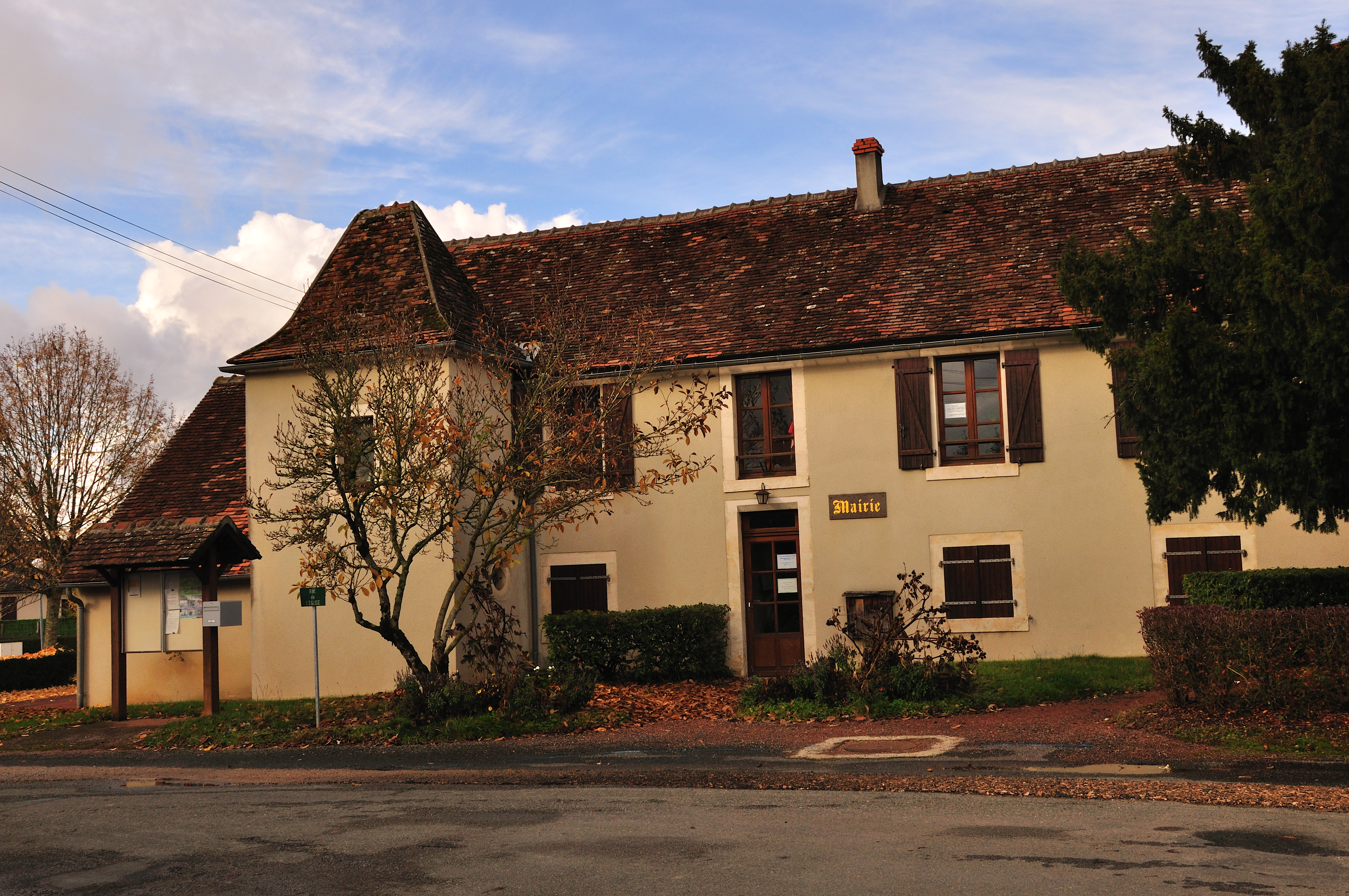
- Town hall

- Coat of arms
- Location of Celon
- Location within France Location within Centre-Val de Loire
- Coordinates: 46°31′10″N 1°30′02″E
- Country: France
- Region: Centre-Val de Loire
- Department: Indre
- Arrondissement: Châteauroux
- Canton: Argenton-sur-Creuse

Government
  - Mayor (2020–2026): Alain Bossard
- Area^{1}: 17.04 km^{2} (6.58 sq mi)
- Elevation: 205 m (673 ft)
- Highest elevation: 249 m (817 ft)
- Lowest elevation: 117 m (384 ft)
- Population (2023): 387
  - Density: 22.7/km^{2} (58.8/sq mi)
- Time zone: UTC+01:00 (CET)
  - Summer (DST): UTC+02:00 (CEST)
- INSEE/Postal code: 36033 /36200
- ^{1} French Land Register data, which excludes lakes, ponds, glaciers > 1 km^{2} (0.386 sq mi or 247 acres) and river estuaries.

Celon (French pronunciation: [səlɔ̃]) is a commune in the Indre department in central France.

== Population ==
Historical population
Year	Pop.	±% p.a.
1968	429	—
1975	417	−0.40%
1982	372	−1.62%
1990	369	−0.10%
1999	382	+0.39%
2007	384	+0.07%
2012	402	+0.92%
2017	407	+0.25%
2023	387	−0.84%
Source: INSEE

== See also ==
- Communes of the Indre department
- Saint-Benoit-du-Sault
