= Varennes =

Varennes may refer to:

== Canada ==
- Varennes, Quebec
- Varennes, Winnipeg, a neighbourhood of Winnipeg, Manitoba, Canada
- Varennes County, a county established 1881 in the disputed District of Keewatin, Canada

== France ==
Varennes is the name of several communes in France:

- Varennes, Dordogne
- Varennes, Haute-Garonne
- Varennes, Indre-et-Loire
- Varennes, Somme
- Varennes, Tarn-et-Garonne
- Varennes, Vienne
- Varennes, Yonne

It is also part of the name of several communes in France:

- Varennes-en-Argonne, in the Meuse département
- Varennes-Changy, in the Loiret département
- Varennes-Jarcy, in the Essonne département
- Varennes-le-Grand, in the Saône-et-Loire département
- Varennes-lès-Mâcon, in the Saône-et-Loire département
- Varennes-lès-Narcy, in the Nièvre département
- Varennes-Saint-Honorat, in the Haute-Loire département
- Varennes-Saint-Sauveur, in the Saône-et-Loire département
- Varennes-sous-Dun, in the Saône-et-Loire département
- Varennes-sur-Allier, in the Allier département
- Varennes-sur-Fouzon, in the Indre département
- Varennes-sur-Loire, in the Maine-et-Loire département
- Varennes-sur-Morge, in the Puy-de-Dôme département
- Varennes-sur-Seine, in the Seine-et-Marne département
- Varennes-sur-Tèche, in the Allier département
- Varennes-sur-Usson, in the Puy-de-Dôme département
- Varennes-Vauzelles, in the Nièvre département
- Courtemont-Varennes, in the Aisne département
- Saint-Loup-de-Varennes, in the Saône-et-Loire département
- Saint-Pierre-de-Varennes, in the Saône-et-Loire département

== See also ==
- Flight to Varennes
- Varenne (disambiguation)
- Pierre Gaultier de Varennes, sieur de La Vérendrye, a Canadian explorer
