= Bagneux =

Bagneux may refer to:

== Communes in France ==
- Bagneux, Aisne
- Bagneux, Allier
- Bagneux, Hauts-de-Seine
- Bagneux, Indre
- Bagneux, Marne
- Bagneux, Meurthe-et-Moselle
- Bagneux-la-Fosse, Aube

== Other ==
- Bagneux British Cemetery, département of the Somme
- Cimetière parisien de Bagneux

== See also ==
- Bagneaux
