= Faverolles-en-Berry =

Commune in Indre, France

- Part of Villentrois-Faverolles-en-Berry
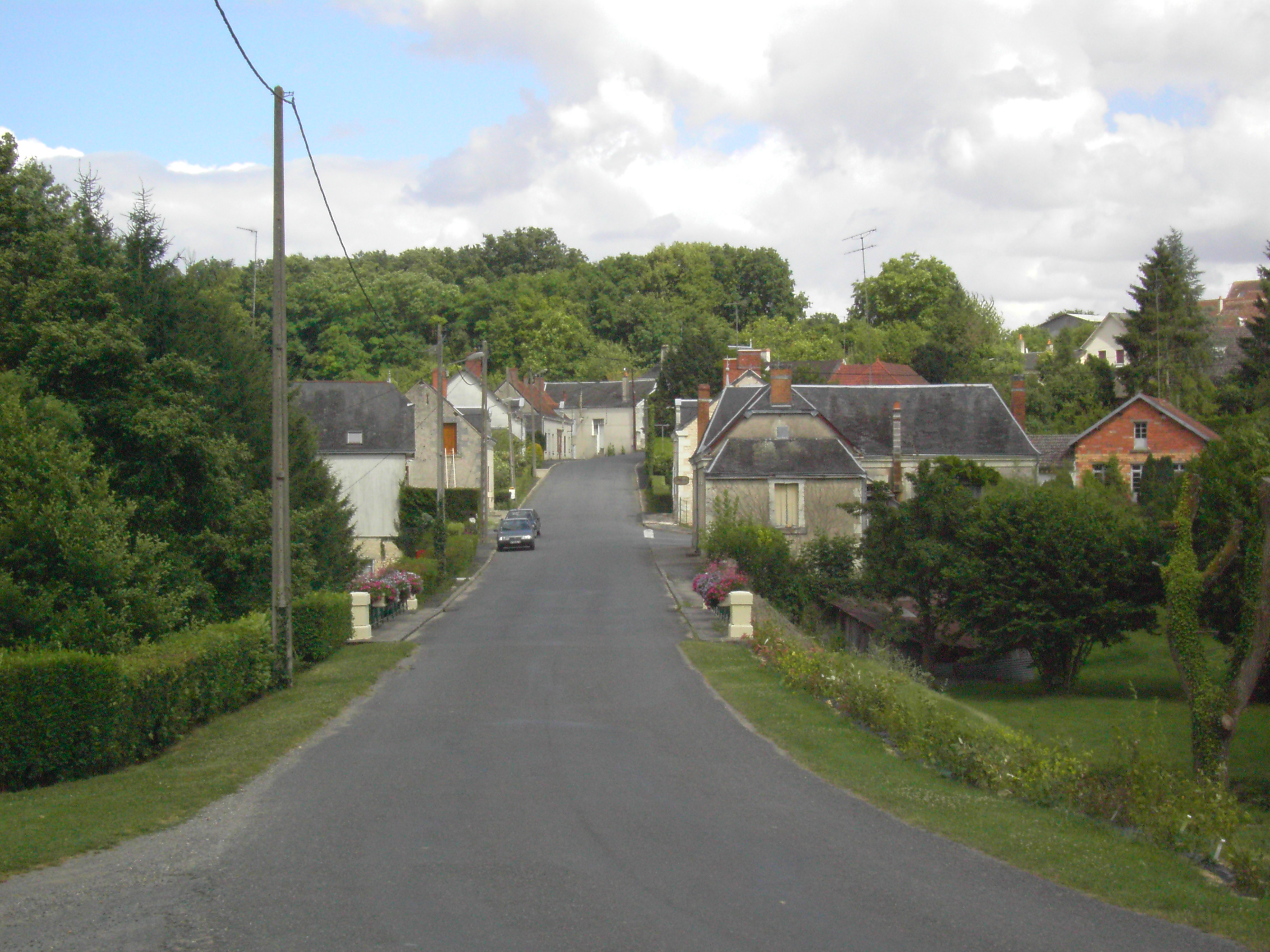
- The road into Faverolles
- Location of Faverolles-en-Berry
- Location within France Location within Centre-Val de Loire
- Coordinates: 47°10′22″N 1°24′33″E
- Country: France
- Region: Centre-Val de Loire
- Department: Indre
- Arrondissement: Châteauroux
- Canton: Valençay
- Commune: Villentrois-Faverolles-en-Berry
- Area^{1}: 41.41 km^{2} (15.99 sq mi)
- Elevation: 122 m (400 ft)
- Highest elevation: 154 m (505 ft)
- Lowest elevation: 91 m (299 ft)
- Population (2023): 326
  - Density: 7.87/km^{2} (20.4/sq mi)
- Time zone: UTC+01:00 (CET)
  - Summer (DST): UTC+02:00 (CEST)
- Postal code: 36360
- ^{1} French Land Register data, which excludes lakes, ponds, glaciers > 1 km^{2} (0.386 sq mi or 247 acres) and river estuaries.

Faverolles-en-Berry (French pronunciation: [favʁɔl ɑ̃ beʁi], literally Faverolles in Berry; before 2017: Faverolles) is a former commune in the Indre department in central France. On 1 January 2019, it was merged into the new commune Villentrois-Faverolles-en-Berry.

== See also ==
- Communes of the Indre department
