= Château Poséidon =

Neo-Renaissance style castle located in France

Coordinates: 47°13′28″N 1°36′58″E

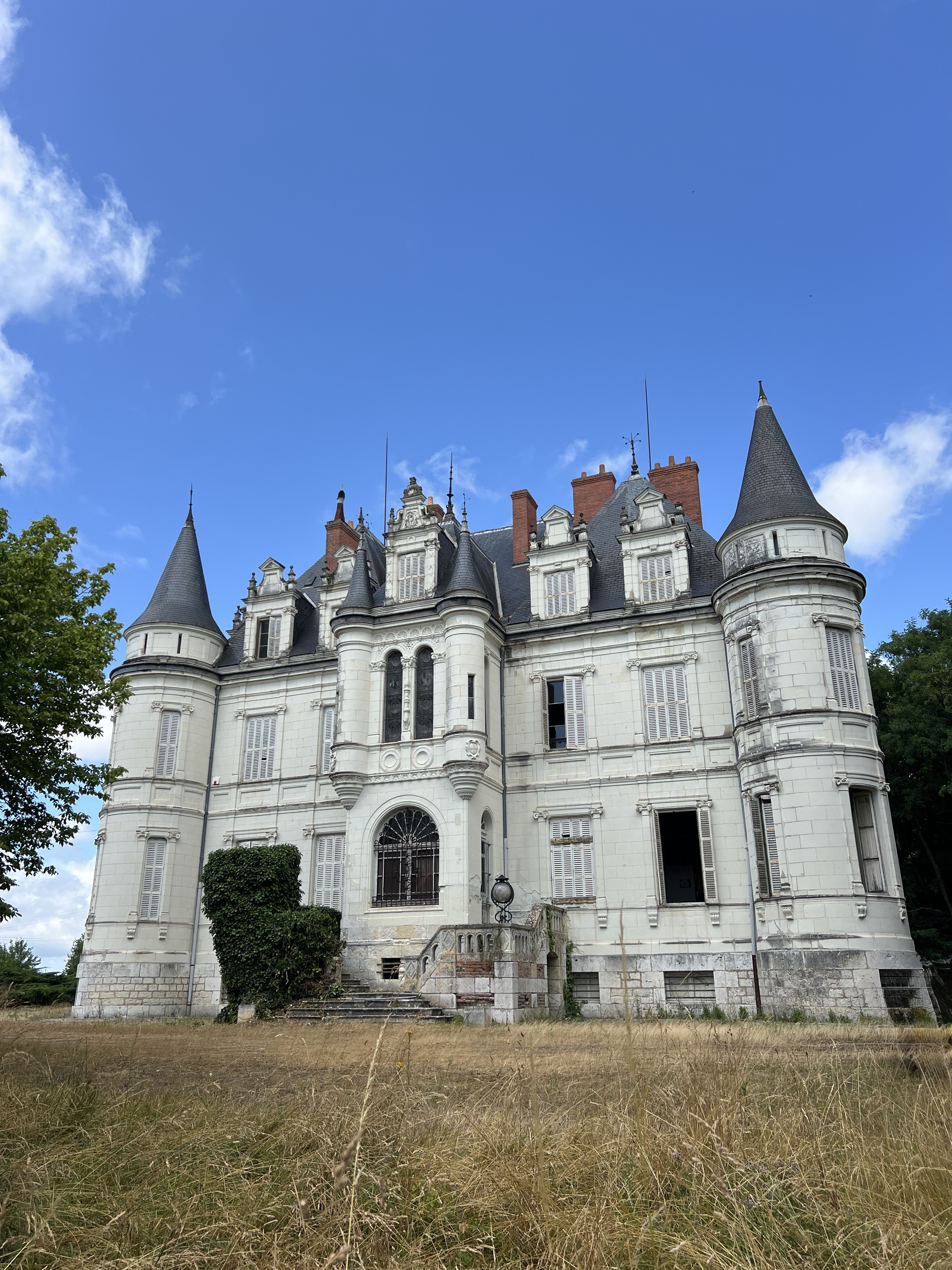
South façade of the castle

Château Poséidon is a château in neo-Renaissance style, located in the French municipality of Varennes-sur-Fouzon, part of the merged municipality of Val-Fouzon in the Indre department. The castle was also known by the name Château de la Borde or Château Laborde.

== History ==
The castle was built between 1860 and 1865, based on a design by Alfred Dauvergne (1824–1885). This architect was very active in the Loire region, particularly in Châteauroux and its surroundings, where he designed numerous churches, vicarages, town halls, schools and castles. For the Château Poséidon, he drew inspiration from the castle of Azay-le-Rideau. The new construction followed the demolition of a previous castle, of which only a keep and the foundations of a second keep remain. The demolition materials were used for the foundations and the base of the new castle.

On the wall in the stairwell, a plaque was placed with the motto Qui veult, peut, French version of the Latin Nihil difficile volenti that can be translated as Yes we can or as Nothing is difficult for those who want it.

=== The Boullet Family ===
Louis Gustave Boullet (1814–1867) and his wife Gabrielle Picot d'Agard (1826–1905) were the first owners of the castle. He belonged to a family of real estate owners and merchants. He died before the works at the castle were completely finished. His widow survived him for almost forty years. They had three children: Henry Adrien Louis Boullet (1847–1907), Gabrielle Boullet (1851–1923) and Gustave Boullet (1863–1884). In 1925 the heritage had to be divided between the surviving heirs, and this resulted in the sale of the domain.

=== Subsequent owners ===
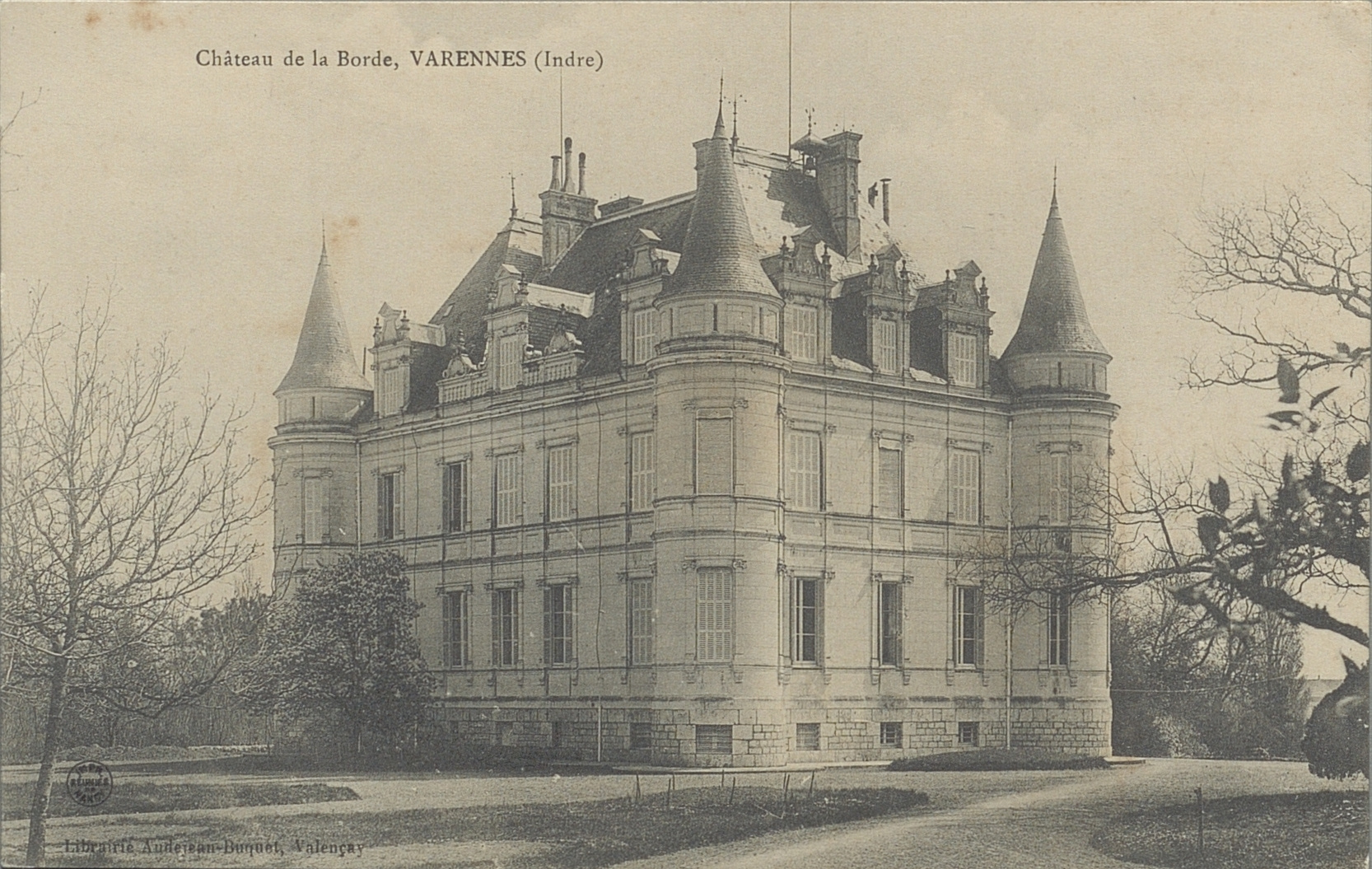
The castle on an old postcard

During the Interbellum and until 1949, the castle was owned by Élie Granat (Kiev, 1889 – Paris, 1969). After obtaining his engineering degree from the École supérieure d’électricité (promotion 1911–12), he became the chief engineer of the company Barbier, Bénard & Turenne. He was the inventor of equipment for air defense and similar devices. During World War II, he supplied weapons to the Allies. A commander in the Légion d'Honneur, he was buried, along with his wife, in the Paris cemetery Père Lachaise. In his memory, a street was named after him in Varennes-sur-Fouzon.

After Granat, the castle became the property of the Coopérative agricole d'élevage du Berry, specializing in artificial insemination of cattle. The administration was located in the castle, the laboratory that collected the semen was located in an outbuilding, and the bulls were kept in stables. After a few decades, activity began to decline, eventually disappearing completely.

In 1980, the property was sold to Josef-Albert Weber, a forty-year-old German who claimed to be a medium, healer and specialist in magnetism. He lived lavishly and financed this by extorting considerable sums from some of his clients. He behaved like a lord of the manor, surrounded by four women, each of whom occupied a room on the upper floor, with bathrooms painted in different colours. He was unable to maintain the fiction of solvency for long and in 1983 he disappeared, leaving behind a mountain of debt, including one of 10 million francs to the tax authorities. He was declared bankrupt and in 1985 the court of Châteauroux proceeded to sell the property at public auction.

The new owner was the 70-year-old German lady Erika Steinmuller. She had been swindled out of eight million francs by the magnetiser. She had no intention of living in the castle, but had vague plans to turn it into a hotel, which came to nothing.

In 1989–90, the estate was purchased by the German developers Herbert Warth and Heinz Windhauser. They bought surrounding plots of land until the estate reached an area of almost 200 hectares. They developed plans for a luxury holiday centre with a hotel capacity of 500 beds and an 18-hole golf course. However, they were unable to find investors, so the plans never came to fruition.

The castle remained uninhabited for four decades. The building fell into disrepair and thefts took place (mantelpieces, ironwork, chandeliers). Despite these scandalous interventions, the castle remained in relatively good physical condition, thanks to monitoring via an alarm system and an attentive neighbour. Discouraged however by the lack of response, the owners sought buyers.

== Architecture ==
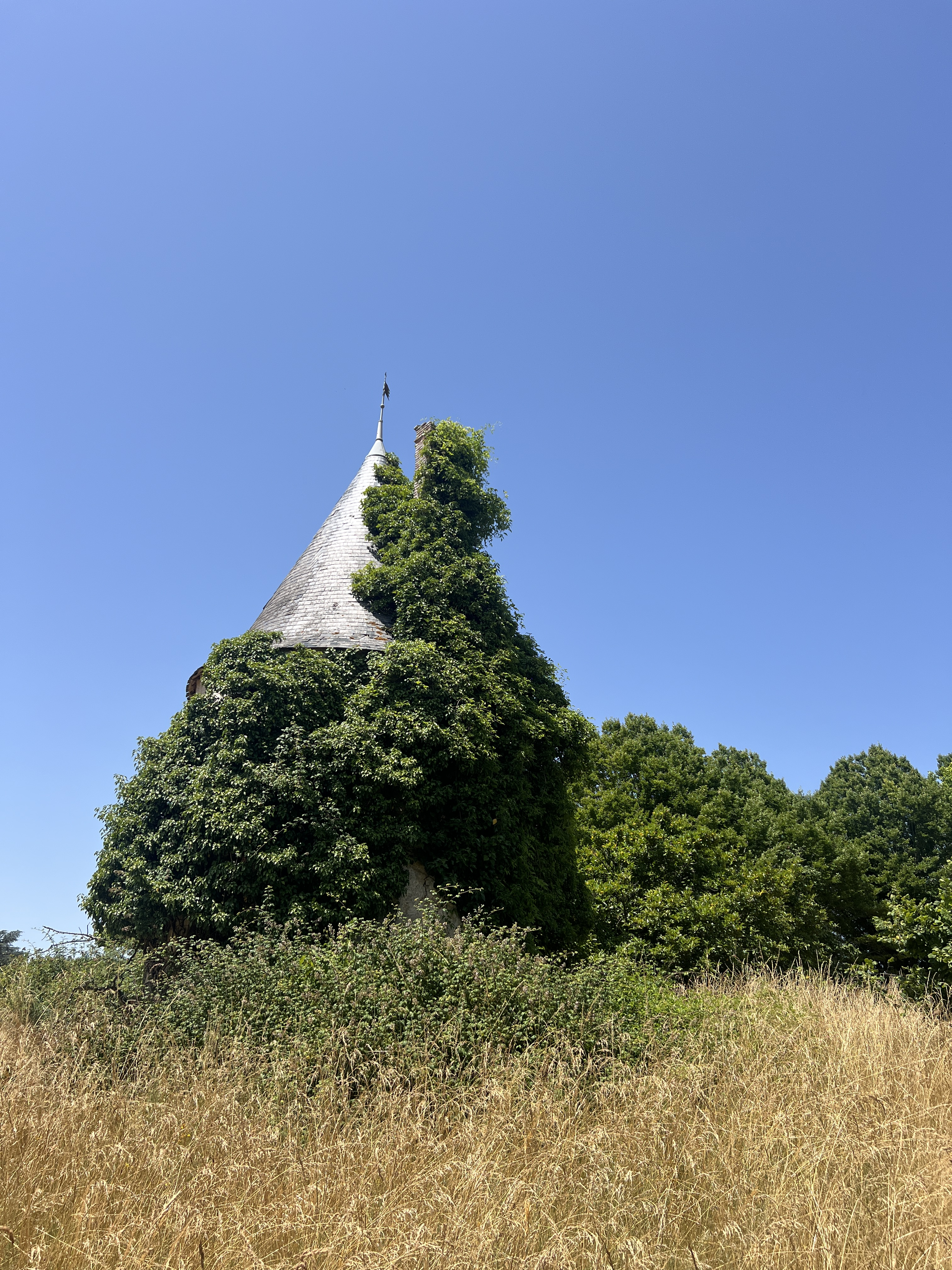
The seventeenth-century tower, one of the last remaining parts of the former castle

The castle was named "Poseidon" because of a sculpture depicting the god of the oceans at the foot of the monumental staircase. The builder was probably professionally connected to the sea.

The central building is finished with a symmetrical tower at each of its four corners. The whole structure extends over five floors:

- the cellars, containing the former kitchens and heating system,
- the ground floor or piano nobile, with its salons and living quarters,
- the first floor with a small chapel and several rooms with bathrooms,
- the second floor with attic rooms for the staff,
- the attics with wooden roof trusses.

There are stained glass windows in various places, the work of master glaziers from Tours, Julien-Léopold Lobin (1814-1864) and his son Lucien-Léopold Lobin (1837–1892).

The following items are in fairly good condition: the entrance door, the monumental staircase, the woodwork of doors and panelling, the carved ceilings, the parquet and stone floors, the frescoes on the walls of the hunting salon, the service staircase, the mantelpieces on the upper floor, and the roof trusses. The facades and roofs have remained in relatively good condition.

The restoration project covers the castle itself, the keep, the caretaker's house (dating from 1960), the entrance gate to be rebuilt, the park and the wooded area covering 17 hectares.

== Restoration ==
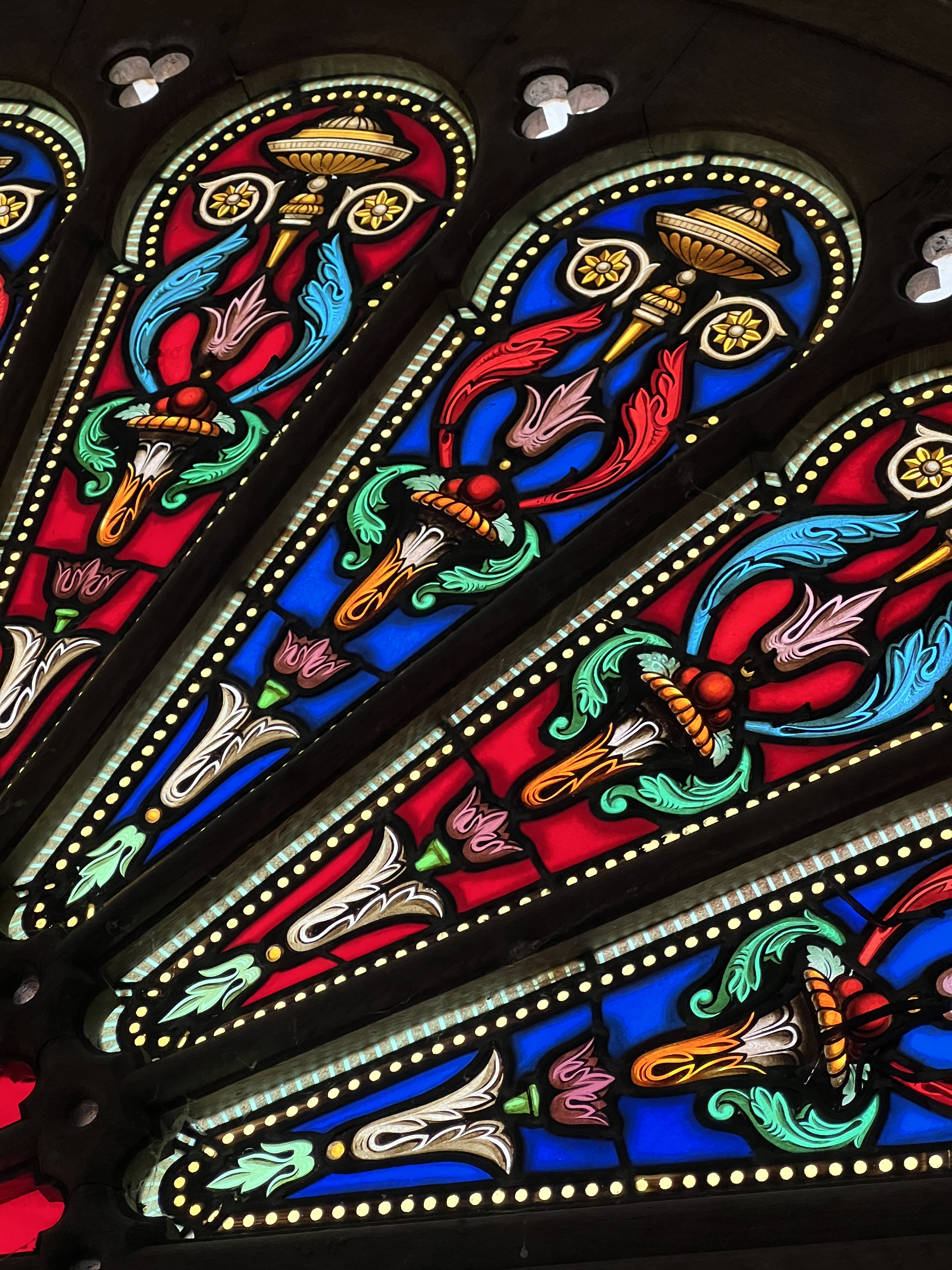
Detail of a stained glass window

In July 2025, the castle came into the possession of two Canadians, Thomas Garneau and Damien Verhaegen. They aim to restore the castle to its former condition and plan to live there permanently themselves. The new owners plan to use the premises for weddings and other events, with guest rooms on the upper floors. They expect this project to be completed within five to ten years.

== Bibliography ==
=== Architect, glazers, inhabitants ===
- « Qui sont les Dauvergne ? », Archives départementales de l'Indre.
- L. HUILLIER, « La famille Lobin et la peinture sur verre en Touraine », Bulletin de la Société archéologique de Touraine, t. 9, 1892, p. 97-110
- Abbé Jean-Jacques Bourassé, J.-Léopold Lobin, peintre d'histoire, directeur de la manufacture de vitraux peints de Tours. Notice biographique, imprimerie de J. Bouserez, Tours, 1864
- Françoise Perrot & Nicole Blondel, L'atelier Lobin, l'art du vitrail en Touraine, CLD, 1995
- Olivier Geneste, Le vitrail en Touraine au XIXe siècle, un foyer de création, Service patrimoine et inventaire de la région Centre - Val-de-Loire, 2022
- Geneanet, notes on Boullet, Picot d'Agard, Conilh de Beyssac.
- Ministère de la Défense, Archives de l'Armée (Château de Vincennes), file Elie Granat
- Grave of Elie Granat at cimetière Père-Lachaise cemetery
- Mabilleau, Flore (12 May 2024). "Ces pierres en sommeil. Le château de la Borde, à Val-Fouzon dans le nord de l'Indre, attend toujours son nouvel élan". La Nouvelle République.

=== The young owners - restorers ===
- Roy, Martine (20 July 2025). "« On suit notre rêve » : ils ont quitté leur vie au Québec pour donner une seconde vie au château de la Borde, à Val-Fouzon". La Nouvelle République du Centre-Ouest.
- Verin, Cécile (30 July 2025). ""Une aventure unique". Ce couple de Québécois a tout plaqué pour un château français abandonné". Ouest France.
- Larin-Kieran, Maude (18 July 2025). "Deux Québécois deviennent propriétaires d'un château en France". TVA Nouvelles (in French).
- Christian Panvert, (22 octobre 2025) Adoubé par les villageois, un couple de Canadiens restaure un château abandonné dans l’Indre, Le Parisien.
