= Sainte-Cécile, Indre =

Sainte-Cécile
- Part of Val-Fouzon
- Location of Sainte-Cécile
- Location within France Location within Centre-Val de Loire
- Coordinates: 47°11′18″N 1°40′14″E
- Country: France
- Region: Centre-Val de Loire
- Department: Indre
- Arrondissement: Issoudun
- Canton: Valençay
- Commune: Val-Fouzon
- Area^{1}: 9.5 km^{2} (3.7 sq mi)
- Elevation: 125 m (410 ft)
- Highest elevation: 121 m (397 ft)
- Lowest elevation: 88 m (289 ft)
- Population (2023): 93
  - Density: 9.8/km^{2} (25/sq mi)
- Time zone: UTC+01:00 (CET)
  - Summer (DST): UTC+02:00 (CEST)
- Postal code: 36210
- ^{1} French Land Register data, which excludes lakes, ponds, glaciers > 1 km^{2} (0.386 sq mi or 247 acres) and river estuaries.

Sainte-Cécile (French pronunciation: [sɛ̃t sesil]) is a former commune in the Indre department in central France. On 1 January 2016, it was merged into the new commune of Val-Fouzon.

== See also ==
- Communes of the Indre department
