= Parpeçay =

- Part of Val-Fouzon
- Location of Parpeçay
- Location within France Location within Centre-Val de Loire
- Coordinates: 47°12′30″N 1°39′10″E
- Country: France
- Region: Centre-Val de Loire
- Department: Indre
- Arrondissement: Issoudun
- Canton: Valençay
- Commune: Val-Fouzon
- Area^{1}: 14.55 km^{2} (5.62 sq mi)
- Elevation: 95 m (312 ft)
- Highest elevation: 118 m (387 ft)
- Lowest elevation: 82 m (269 ft)
- Population (2023): 227
  - Density: 15.6/km^{2} (40.4/sq mi)
- Time zone: UTC+01:00 (CET)
  - Summer (DST): UTC+02:00 (CEST)
- Postal code: 36210
- ^{1} French Land Register data, which excludes lakes, ponds, glaciers > 1 km^{2} (0.386 sq mi or 247 acres) and river estuaries.

Parpeçay (French pronunciation: [paʁpəsɛ]) is a former commune in the Indre department in central France. On 1 January 2016, it was merged into the new commune of Val-Fouzon.

== See also ==
- Communes of the Indre department
