= Villentrois =

Commune in Indre, France

- Part of Villentrois-Faverolles-en-Berry
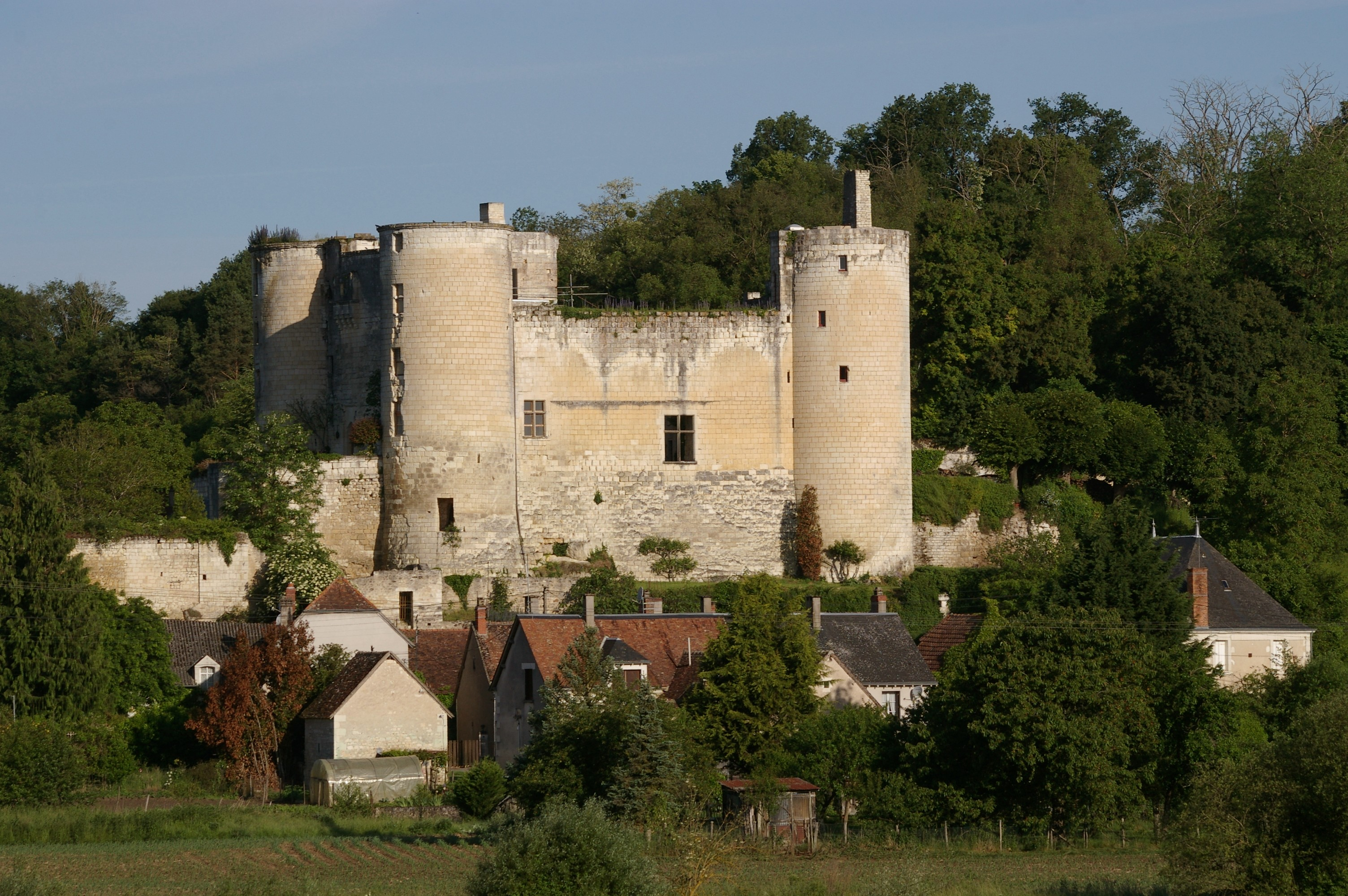
- Chateau
- Location of Villentrois
- Location within France Location within Centre-Val de Loire
- Coordinates: 47°11′41″N 1°27′48″E
- Country: France
- Region: Centre-Val de Loire
- Department: Indre
- Arrondissement: Châteauroux
- Canton: Valençay
- Commune: Villentrois-Faverolles-en-Berry
- Area^{1}: 32.38 km^{2} (12.50 sq mi)
- Elevation: 93 m (305 ft)
- Highest elevation: 151 m (495 ft)
- Lowest elevation: 85 m (279 ft)
- Population (2023): 560
  - Density: 17/km^{2} (45/sq mi)
- Time zone: UTC+01:00 (CET)
  - Summer (DST): UTC+02:00 (CEST)
- Postal code: 36600
- ^{1} French Land Register data, which excludes lakes, ponds, glaciers > 1 km^{2} (0.386 sq mi or 247 acres) and river estuaries.

Villentrois (French pronunciation: [vilɑ̃tʁwa]) is a former commune in the Indre department in central France. On 1 January 2019, it was merged into the new commune Villentrois-Faverolles-en-Berry.

== See also ==
- Communes of the Indre department
