= Langé =

- Commune
- Location of Langé
- Location within France Location within Centre-Val de Loire
- Coordinates: 47°04′29″N 1°30′52″E
- Country: France
- Region: Centre-Val de Loire
- Department: Indre
- Arrondissement: Châteauroux
- Canton: Valençay

Government
  - Mayor (2020–2026): Patrick Gargaud
- Area^{1}: 20.63 km^{2} (7.97 sq mi)
- Elevation: 110 m (360 ft)
- Highest elevation: 177 m (581 ft)
- Lowest elevation: 105 m (344 ft)
- Population (2023): 253
  - Density: 12.3/km^{2} (31.8/sq mi)
- Time zone: UTC+01:00 (CET)
  - Summer (DST): UTC+02:00 (CEST)
- INSEE/Postal code: 36092 /36600
- ^{1} French Land Register data, which excludes lakes, ponds, glaciers > 1 km^{2} (0.386 sq mi or 247 acres) and river estuaries.

Langé (French pronunciation: [lɑ̃ʒe]) is a commune in the Indre department in central France.

== Population ==
Historical population
Year	Pop.	±% p.a.
1968	494	—
1975	437	−1.74%
1982	384	−1.83%
1990	339	−1.55%
1999	293	−1.61%
2007	300	+0.30%
2012	297	−0.20%
2017	285	−0.82%
2023	253	−1.97%
Source: INSEE

== See also ==
- Communes of the Indre department
