= Varenne (disambiguation) =

Varenne is a race horse.

Varenne or La Varenne may also refer to:

== Places in France ==
- La Varenne-Saint-Hilaire, a village in the commune of Saint-Maur-des-Fossés, Val-de-Marne department
- La Varenne, Maine-et-Loire, a commune in the Maine-et-Loire department
- Varenne-l'Arconce, a commune in the Saône-et-Loire department
- Varenne-Saint-Germain, a commune in the Saône-et-Loire department
- Varenne station, a Paris Metro station
- La Varenne–Chennevières station, a railway station in the Val-de-Marne department

== Rivers in France ==
- Varenne (Arques), a tributary of the Arques in the Seine-Maritime department
- Varenne (Mayenne), a tributary of the Mayenne in the Orne and Mayenne departments

== People with the surname ==
- François Pierre La Varenne (1618–1678), French author
- Guillaume Fouquet de la Varenne (1560–1616), French statesman
- Alex Varenne, French comic book artist and writer
- Gaëtan Varenne, football player
- Jean Varenne, French indologist

== See also ==
- Varennes (disambiguation)
