= Varennes-sur-Fouzon =

- Part of Val-Fouzon
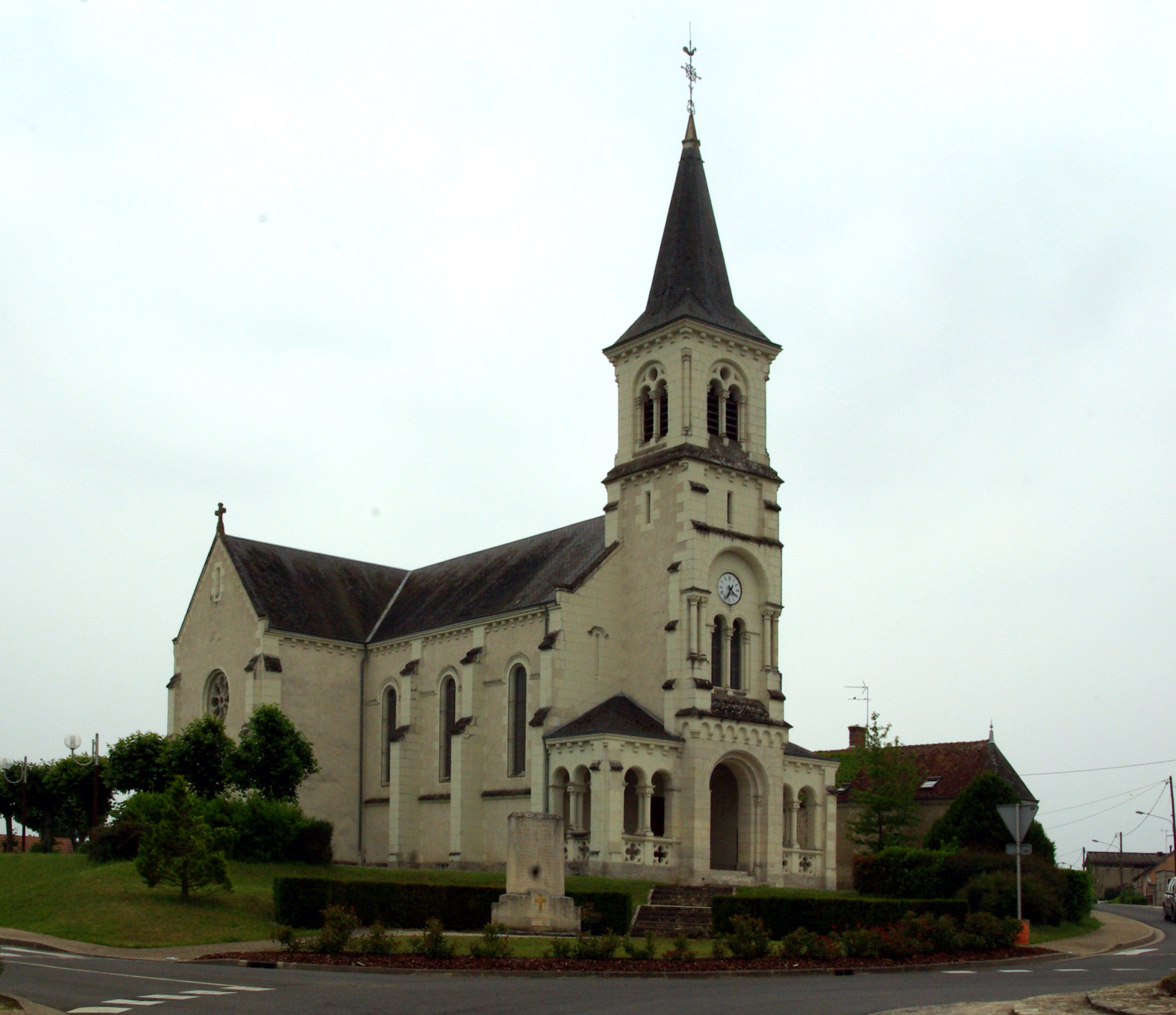
- The church in Varennes-sur-Fouzon
- Location of Varennes-sur-Fouzon
- Location within France Location within Centre-Val de Loire
- Coordinates: 47°12′50″N 1°36′24″E
- Country: France
- Region: Centre-Val de Loire
- Department: Indre
- Arrondissement: Issoudun
- Canton: Valençay
- Commune: Val-Fouzon
- Area^{1}: 22.85 km^{2} (8.82 sq mi)
- Elevation: 98 m (322 ft)
- Highest elevation: 132 m (433 ft)
- Lowest elevation: 77 m (253 ft)
- Population (2023): 648
  - Density: 28.4/km^{2} (73.4/sq mi)
- Time zone: UTC+01:00 (CET)
  - Summer (DST): UTC+02:00 (CEST)
- Postal code: 36210
- ^{1} French Land Register data, which excludes lakes, ponds, glaciers > 1 km^{2} (0.386 sq mi or 247 acres) and river estuaries.

Varennes-sur-Fouzon (French pronunciation: [vaʁɛn syʁ fuzɔ̃], literally "Varennes on Fouzon") is a former commune in the Indre department in central France. On 1 January 2016, it was merged into the new commune of Val-Fouzon.

== Notable buildings ==
- Poséidon Castle, a nineteenth-century mansion
- Saint-Lignace, parish church

== See also ==
- Communes of the Indre department
