= Fontguenand =

- Commune
- Location of Fontguenand
- Location within France Location within Centre-Val de Loire
- Coordinates: 47°13′08″N 1°32′19″E
- Country: France
- Region: Centre-Val de Loire
- Department: Indre
- Arrondissement: Châteauroux
- Canton: Valençay
- Intercommunality: Écueillé-Valençay

Government
  - Mayor (2020–2026): Georges Bideaux
- Area^{1}: 18.24 km^{2} (7.04 sq mi)
- Elevation: 100 m (330 ft)
- Highest elevation: 141 m (463 ft)
- Lowest elevation: 86 m (282 ft)
- Population (2023): 248
  - Density: 13.6/km^{2} (35.2/sq mi)
- Time zone: UTC+01:00 (CET)
  - Summer (DST): UTC+02:00 (CEST)
- INSEE/Postal code: 36077 /36600
- ^{1} French Land Register data, which excludes lakes, ponds, glaciers > 1 km^{2} (0.386 sq mi or 247 acres) and river estuaries.

Fontguenand (French pronunciation: [fɔ̃ɡənɑ̃]) is a commune in the Indre department in central France.

== Population ==
Historical population
Year	Pop.	±% p.a.
1968	284	—
1975	252	−1.69%
1982	240	−0.69%
1990	223	−0.91%
1999	230	+0.34%
2007	241	+0.59%
2012	235	−0.50%
2017	238	+0.25%
2023	248	+0.69%
Source: INSEE

== See also ==
- Communes of the Indre department
