= Saint-Christophe-en-Bazelle =

- Commune
- Coat of arms
- Location of Saint-Christophe-en-Bazelle
- Location within France Location within Centre-Val de Loire
- Coordinates: 47°11′34″N 1°42′45″E
- Country: France
- Region: Centre-Val de Loire
- Department: Indre
- Arrondissement: Issoudun
- Canton: Valençay

Government
  - Mayor (2020–2026): Bruno Dion
- Area^{1}: 13.94 km^{2} (5.38 sq mi)
- Elevation: 111 m (364 ft)
- Highest elevation: 135 m (443 ft)
- Lowest elevation: 97 m (318 ft)
- Population (2023): 355
  - Density: 25.5/km^{2} (66.0/sq mi)
- Time zone: UTC+01:00 (CET)
  - Summer (DST): UTC+02:00 (CEST)
- INSEE/Postal code: 36185 /36210
- ^{1} French Land Register data, which excludes lakes, ponds, glaciers > 1 km^{2} (0.386 sq mi or 247 acres) and river estuaries.

Saint-Christophe-en-Bazelle is a commune in the Indre department in central France.

== Population ==
Historical population
Year	Pop.	±% p.a.
1968	429	—
1975	382	−1.64%
1982	356	−1.00%
1990	348	−0.28%
1999	374	+0.80%
2007	378	+0.13%
2012	390	+0.63%
2017	379	−0.57%
2023	355	−1.08%
Source: INSEE

== See also ==
- Communes of the Indre department
