= Orville, Indre =

Orville
- Commune
- Location of Orville
- Location within France Location within Centre-Val de Loire
- Coordinates: 47°09′11″N 1°47′30″E
- Country: France
- Region: Centre-Val de Loire
- Department: Indre
- Arrondissement: Issoudun
- Canton: Valençay
- Intercommunality: Chabris - Pays de Bazelle

Government
  - Mayor (2020–2026): Monique Roger
- Area^{1}: 9.35 km^{2} (3.61 sq mi)
- Elevation: 125 m (410 ft)
- Highest elevation: 152 m (499 ft)
- Lowest elevation: 97 m (318 ft)
- Population (2023): 137
  - Density: 14.7/km^{2} (37.9/sq mi)
- Time zone: UTC+01:00 (CET)
  - Summer (DST): UTC+02:00 (CEST)
- INSEE/Postal code: 36147 /36210
- ^{1} French Land Register data, which excludes lakes, ponds, glaciers > 1 km^{2} (0.386 sq mi or 247 acres) and river estuaries.

Orville (French pronunciation: [ɔʁvil]) is a commune in the Indre department in central France.

== Population ==
Historical population
Year	Pop.	±% p.a.
1968	198	—
1975	146	−4.26%
1982	146	+0.00%
1990	144	−0.17%
1999	120	−2.01%
2007	126	+0.61%
2012	127	+0.16%
2017	138	+1.68%
2023	137	−0.12%
Source: INSEE

== See also ==
- Communes of the Indre department
