= Anjouin =

- Commune
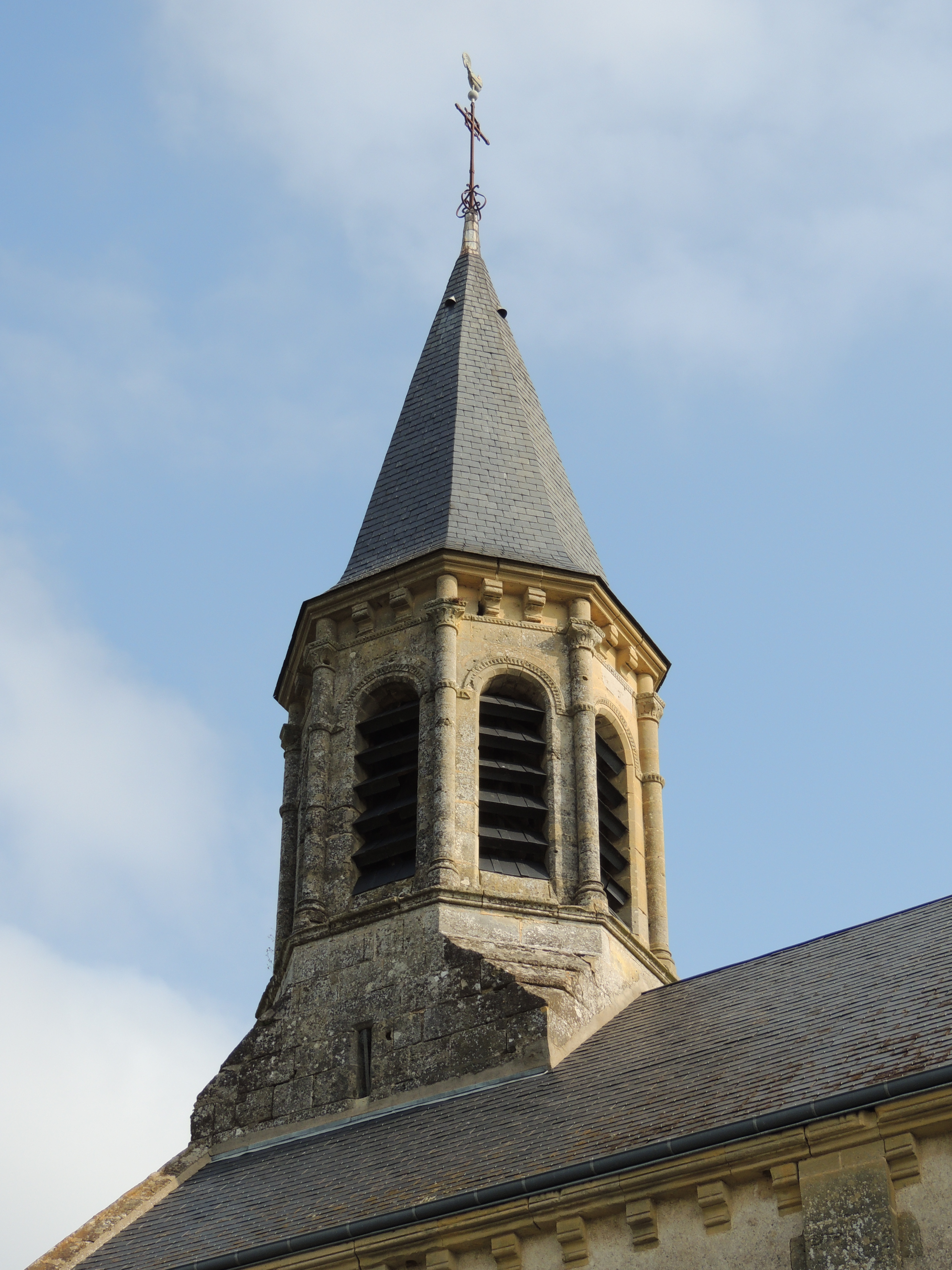
- The bell tower of the church of Saint-Martin, in Anjouin
- Location of Anjouin
- Location within France Location within Centre-Val de Loire
- Coordinates: 47°11′25″N 1°48′06″E
- Country: France
- Region: Centre-Val de Loire
- Department: Indre
- Arrondissement: Issoudun
- Canton: Valençay
- Intercommunality: Chabris - Pays de Bazelle

Government
  - Mayor (2020–2026): Jacques-Henri Lepreux
- Area^{1}: 28.91 km^{2} (11.16 sq mi)
- Elevation: 114 m (374 ft)
- Highest elevation: 151 m (495 ft)
- Lowest elevation: 94 m (308 ft)
- Population (2023): 313
  - Density: 10.8/km^{2} (28.0/sq mi)
- Time zone: UTC+01:00 (CET)
  - Summer (DST): UTC+02:00 (CEST)
- INSEE/Postal code: 36004 /36210
- ^{1} French Land Register data, which excludes lakes, ponds, glaciers > 1 km^{2} (0.386 sq mi or 247 acres) and river estuaries.

Anjouin (French pronunciation: [ɑ̃ʒwɛ̃]) is a commune in the Indre department in central France.

== Population ==
Historical population
Year	Pop.	±% p.a.
1968	435	—
1975	380	−1.91%
1982	405	+0.91%
1990	348	−1.88%
1999	339	−0.29%
2007	350	+0.40%
2012	339	−0.64%
2017	331	−0.48%
2023	313	−0.93%
Source: INSEE

== See also ==
- Communes of the Indre department
