= Poulaines, France =

Poulaines
- Commune
- Coat of arms
- Location of Poulaines
- Location within France Location within Centre-Val de Loire
- Coordinates: 47°09′10″N 1°39′51″E
- Country: France
- Region: Centre-Val de Loire
- Department: Indre
- Arrondissement: Issoudun
- Canton: Valençay

Government
  - Mayor (2020–2026): Yves Cron
- Area^{1}: 46.32 km^{2} (17.88 sq mi)
- Elevation: 110 m (360 ft)
- Highest elevation: 156 m (512 ft)
- Lowest elevation: 87 m (285 ft)
- Population (2023): 816
  - Density: 17.6/km^{2} (45.6/sq mi)
- Time zone: UTC+01:00 (CET)
  - Summer (DST): UTC+02:00 (CEST)
- INSEE/Postal code: 36162 /36210
- ^{1} French Land Register data, which excludes lakes, ponds, glaciers > 1 km^{2} (0.386 sq mi or 247 acres) and river estuaries.

Poulaines is a commune in the Indre department in central France. Its coat of arms shows a poulaine, the pointy-toed shoe fashionable in the 14th and 15th centuries.

== Population ==
Historical population
Year	Pop.	±% p.a.
1968	1,167	—
1975	1,045	−1.57%
1982	926	−1.71%
1990	911	−0.20%
1999	838	−0.92%
2007	877	+0.57%
2012	897	+0.45%
2017	845	−1.19%
2023	816	−0.58%
Source: INSEE

== See also ==
- Communes of the Indre department
