= Gehée =

- Commune
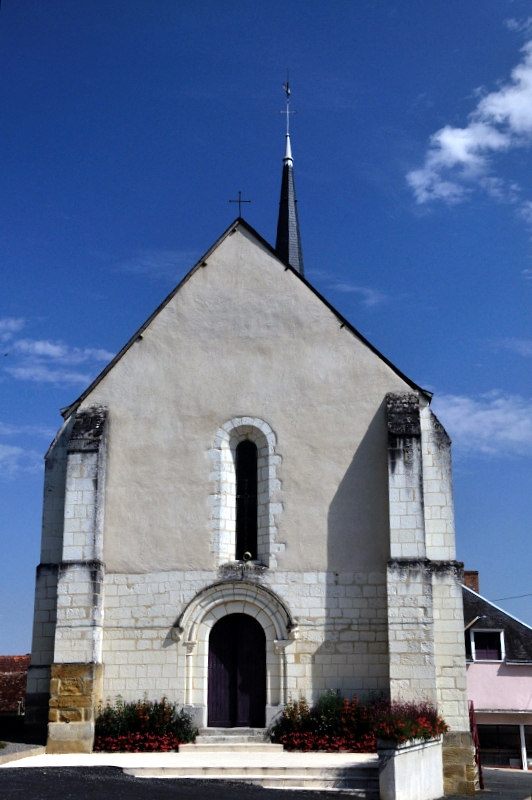
- The church of Saint-Etienne, in Géhée

- Coat of arms
- Location of Gehée
- Location within France Location within Centre-Val de Loire
- Coordinates: 47°02′51″N 1°30′10″E
- Country: France
- Region: Centre-Val de Loire
- Department: Indre
- Arrondissement: Châteauroux
- Canton: Valençay

Government
  - Mayor (2020–2026): Alain Reuillon
- Area^{1}: 22.75 km^{2} (8.78 sq mi)
- Elevation: 200 m (660 ft)
- Highest elevation: 178 m (584 ft)
- Lowest elevation: 112 m (367 ft)
- Population (2023): 253
  - Density: 11.1/km^{2} (28.8/sq mi)
- Time zone: UTC+01:00 (CET)
  - Summer (DST): UTC+02:00 (CEST)
- INSEE/Postal code: 36082 /36240
- ^{1} French Land Register data, which excludes lakes, ponds, glaciers > 1 km^{2} (0.386 sq mi or 247 acres) and river estuaries.

Gehée (French pronunciation: [ʒə.e]) is a commune in the Indre department in central France.

== Population ==
Historical population
Year	Pop.	±% p.a.
1968	480	—
1975	439	−1.27%
1982	352	−3.11%
1990	313	−1.46%
1999	301	−0.43%
2007	305	+0.17%
2012	262	−2.99%
2017	255	−0.54%
2023	253	−0.13%
Source: INSEE

== See also ==
- Communes of the Indre department
