= La Vernelle =

- Commune
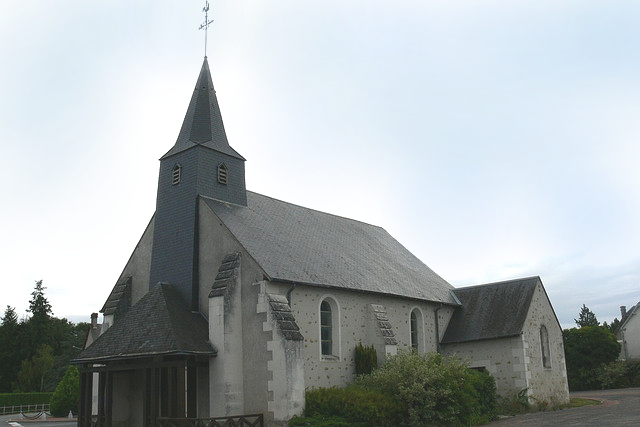
- The church in La Vernelle
- Location of La Vernelle
- Location within France Location within Centre-Val de Loire
- Coordinates: 47°14′56″N 1°32′38″E
- Country: France
- Region: Centre-Val de Loire
- Department: Indre
- Arrondissement: Châteauroux
- Canton: Valençay
- Intercommunality: Écueillé-Valençay

Government
  - Mayor (2020–2026): Annick Brossier
- Area^{1}: 17.08 km^{2} (6.59 sq mi)
- Elevation: 81 m (266 ft)
- Highest elevation: 114 m (374 ft)
- Lowest elevation: 71 m (233 ft)
- Population (2023): 799
  - Density: 46.8/km^{2} (121/sq mi)
- Time zone: UTC+01:00 (CET)
  - Summer (DST): UTC+02:00 (CEST)
- INSEE/Postal code: 36233 /36600
- ^{1} French Land Register data, which excludes lakes, ponds, glaciers > 1 km^{2} (0.386 sq mi or 247 acres) and river estuaries.

La Vernelle (French pronunciation: [la vɛʁnɛl]) is a commune in the Indre department in central France.

== Population ==
Historical population
| Year | Pop. | ±% p.a. |
|---|---|---|
| 1968 | 715 | — |
| 1975 | 713 | −0.04% |
| 1982 | 696 | −0.34% |
| 1990 | 640 | −1.04% |
| 1999 | 693 | +0.89% |
| 2007 | 786 | +1.59% |
| 2012 | 781 | −0.13% |
| 2017 | 748 | −0.86% |
| 2023 | 799 | +1.11% |
Source: INSEE

== See also ==
- Communes of the Indre department
