= Heugnes =

- Commune
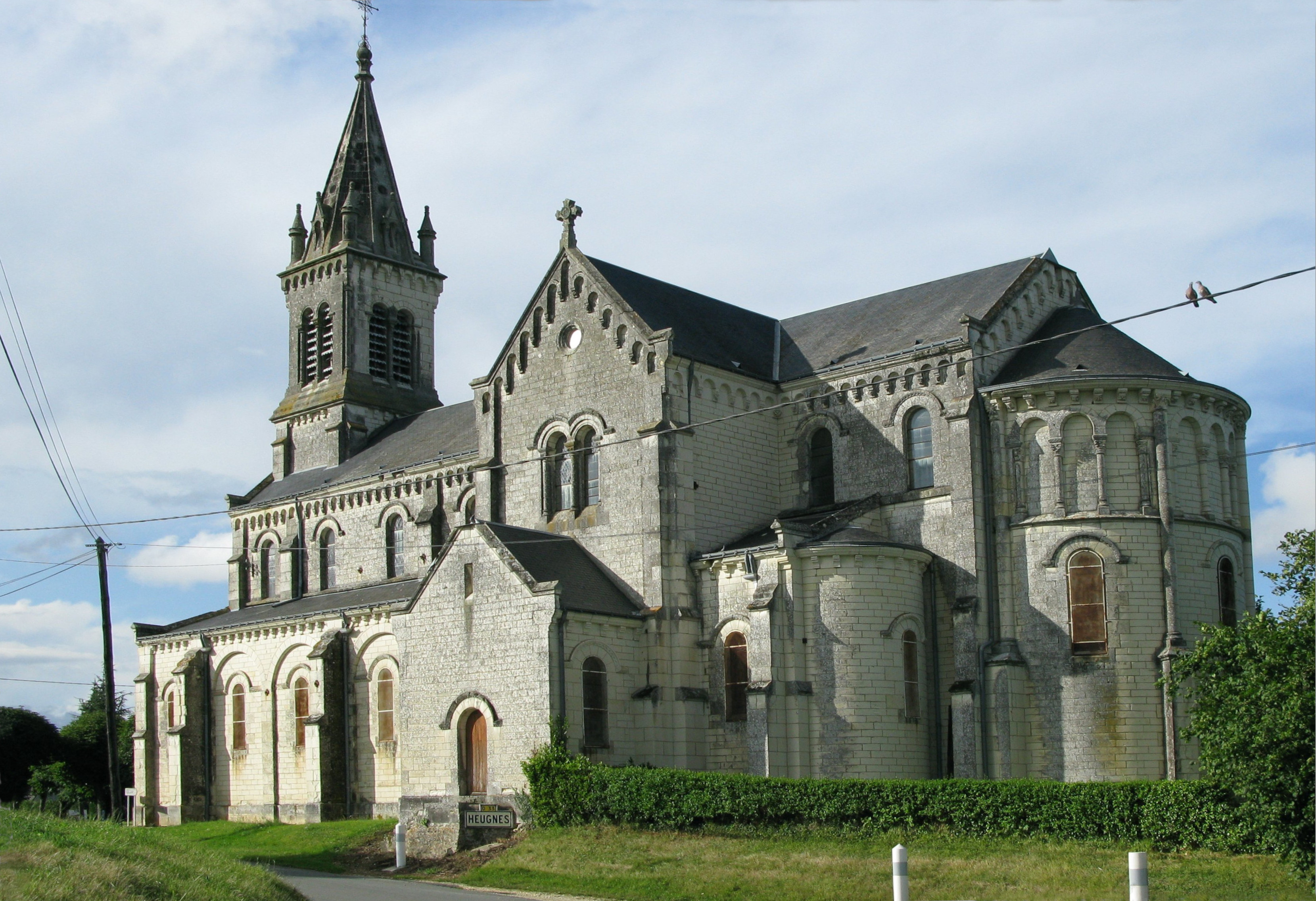
- The church of Saint-Martin, in Heugnes

- Coat of arms
- Location of Heugnes
- Location within France Location within Centre-Val de Loire
- Coordinates: 47°00′46″N 1°24′34″E
- Country: France
- Region: Centre-Val de Loire
- Department: Indre
- Arrondissement: Châteauroux
- Canton: Valençay

Government
  - Mayor (2020–2026): Philippe Kocher
- Area^{1}: 42.17 km^{2} (16.28 sq mi)
- Elevation: 190 m (620 ft)
- Highest elevation: 201 m (659 ft)
- Lowest elevation: 133 m (436 ft)
- Population (2023): 380
  - Density: 9.0/km^{2} (23/sq mi)
- Time zone: UTC+01:00 (CET)
  - Summer (DST): UTC+02:00 (CEST)
- INSEE/Postal code: 36086 /36180
- ^{1} French Land Register data, which excludes lakes, ponds, glaciers > 1 km^{2} (0.386 sq mi or 247 acres) and river estuaries.

Heugnes (French pronunciation: [œɲ]) is a commune in the Indre department in central France.

== Population ==
Historical population
Year	Pop.	±% p.a.
1968	562	—
1975	466	−2.64%
1982	423	−1.37%
1990	399	−0.73%
1999	436	+0.99%
2007	408	−0.83%
2012	399	−0.45%
2017	394	−0.25%
2023	380	−0.60%
Source: INSEE

== See also ==
- Communes of the Indre department
