= Dun-le-Poëlier =

- Commune
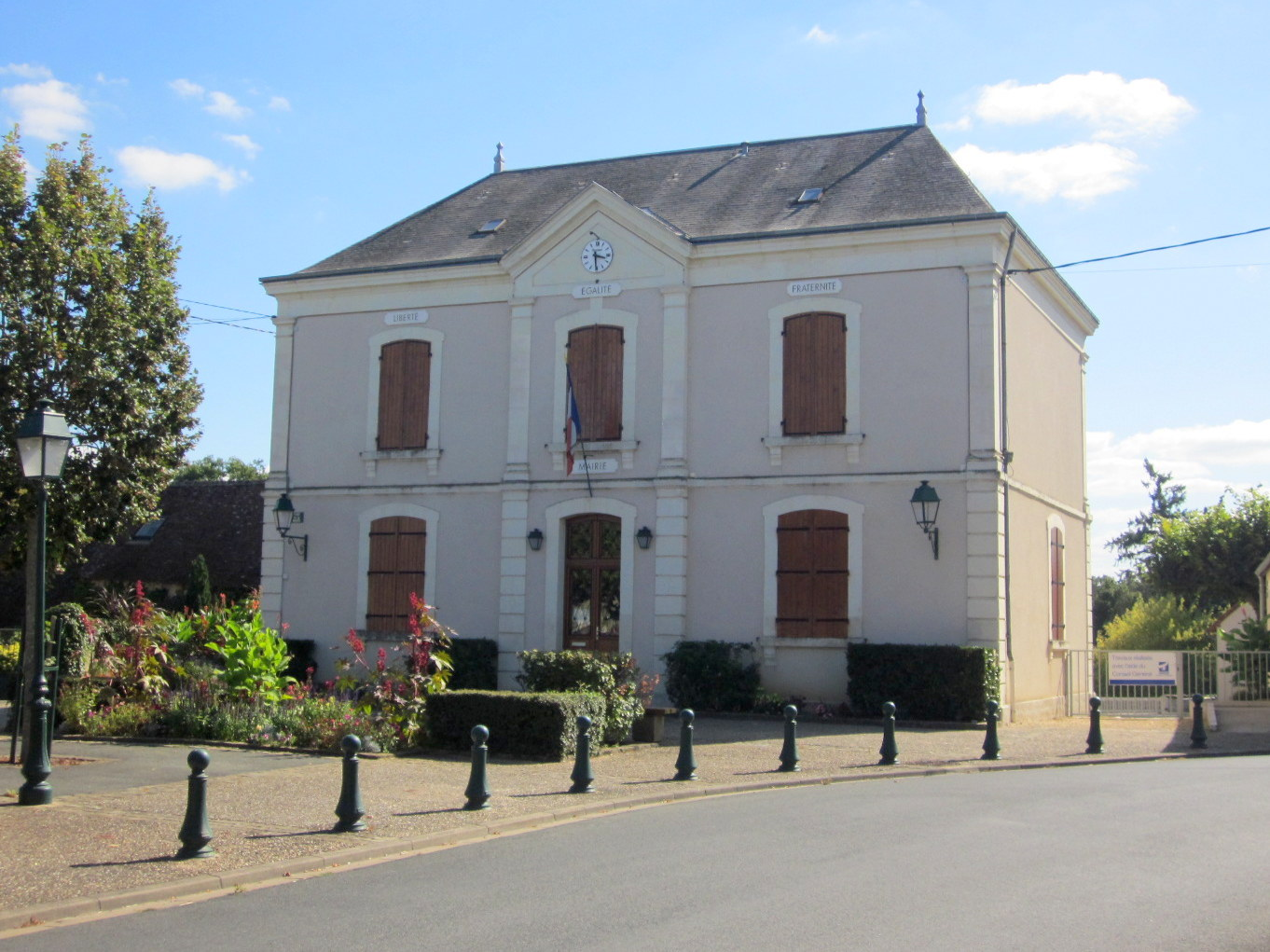
- The town hall in Dun-le-Poëlier
- Location of Dun-le-Poëlier
- Location within France Location within Centre-Val de Loire
- Coordinates: 47°12′16″N 1°45′16″E
- Country: France
- Region: Centre-Val de Loire
- Department: Indre
- Arrondissement: Issoudun
- Canton: Valençay
- Intercommunality: Chabris - Pays de Bazelle

Government
  - Mayor (2020–2026): Bernard Villerette
- Area^{1}: 22.56 km^{2} (8.71 sq mi)
- Highest elevation: 140 m (460 ft)
- Lowest elevation: 87 m (285 ft)
- Population (2023): 445
  - Density: 19.7/km^{2} (51.1/sq mi)
- Time zone: UTC+01:00 (CET)
  - Summer (DST): UTC+02:00 (CEST)
- INSEE/Postal code: 36068 /36210
- ^{1} French Land Register data, which excludes lakes, ponds, glaciers > 1 km^{2} (0.386 sq mi or 247 acres) and river estuaries.

Dun-le-Poëlier (French pronunciation: [dœ̃ lə pwalje]) is a commune in the Indre department in central France.

== History ==
During World War II, Dun-le-Poëlier was liberated by Free French troops in September 1944 following an engagement with the German Tiger Legion.

== Population ==
Historical population
Year	Pop.	±% p.a.
1968	593	—
1975	576	−0.41%
1982	523	−1.37%
1990	496	−0.66%
1999	457	−0.91%
2007	488	+0.82%
2012	461	−1.13%
2017	426	−1.57%
2023	445	+0.73%
Source: INSEE

== See also ==
- Communes of the Indre department
