= Selles-sur-Nahon =

- Commune
- Location of Selles-sur-Nahon
- Location within France Location within Centre-Val de Loire
- Coordinates: 47°01′03″N 1°26′55″E
- Country: France
- Region: Centre-Val de Loire
- Department: Indre
- Arrondissement: Châteauroux
- Canton: Valençay

Government
  - Mayor (2020–2026): Chantal Godart
- Area^{1}: 6.77 km^{2} (2.61 sq mi)
- Elevation: 128 m (420 ft)
- Highest elevation: 170 m (560 ft)
- Lowest elevation: 118 m (387 ft)
- Population (2023): 61
  - Density: 9.0/km^{2} (23/sq mi)
- Time zone: UTC+01:00 (CET)
  - Summer (DST): UTC+02:00 (CEST)
- INSEE/Postal code: 36216 /36180
- ^{1} French Land Register data, which excludes lakes, ponds, glaciers > 1 km^{2} (0.386 sq mi or 247 acres) and river estuaries.

Selles-sur-Nahon (French pronunciation: [sɛl syʁ na.ɔ̃]) is a commune in the Indre department in central France.

== Population ==
Historical population
Year	Pop.	±% p.a.
1968	120	—
1975	108	−1.49%
1982	101	−0.95%
1990	89	−1.57%
1999	72	−2.33%
2007	56	−3.09%
2012	71	+4.86%
2017	70	−0.28%
2023	61	−2.27%
Source: INSEE

== See also ==
- Communes of the Indre department
