= Frédille =

- Commune
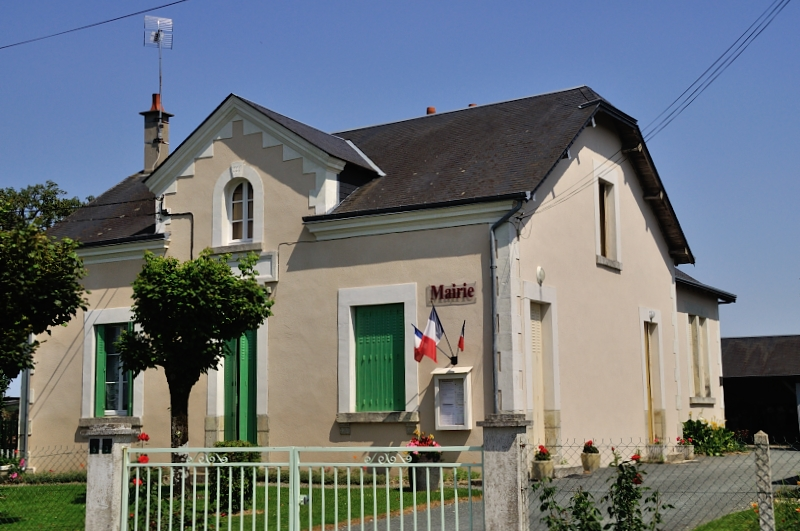
- The town hall in Frédille

- Coat of arms
- Location of Frédille
- Location within France Location within Centre-Val de Loire
- Coordinates: 47°00′11″N 1°28′51″E
- Country: France
- Region: Centre-Val de Loire
- Department: Indre
- Arrondissement: Châteauroux
- Canton: Valençay

Government
  - Mayor (2020–2026): Christiane Huot
- Area^{1}: 6.31 km^{2} (2.44 sq mi)
- Elevation: 162 m (531 ft)
- Highest elevation: 172 m (564 ft)
- Lowest elevation: 120 m (390 ft)
- Population (2023): 77
  - Density: 12/km^{2} (32/sq mi)
- Time zone: UTC+01:00 (CET)
  - Summer (DST): UTC+02:00 (CEST)
- INSEE/Postal code: 36080 /36180
- ^{1} French Land Register data, which excludes lakes, ponds, glaciers > 1 km^{2} (0.386 sq mi or 247 acres) and river estuaries.

Frédille (French pronunciation: [fʁedij]) is a commune in the Indre department in central France.

== Population ==
Historical population
Year	Pop.	±% p.a.
1968	121	—
1975	84	−5.08%
1982	81	−0.52%
1990	77	−0.63%
1999	74	−0.44%
2007	64	−1.80%
2012	72	+2.38%
2017	71	−0.28%
2023	77	+1.36%
Source: INSEE

== See also ==
- Communes of the Indre department
