= Écueillé =

- Commune
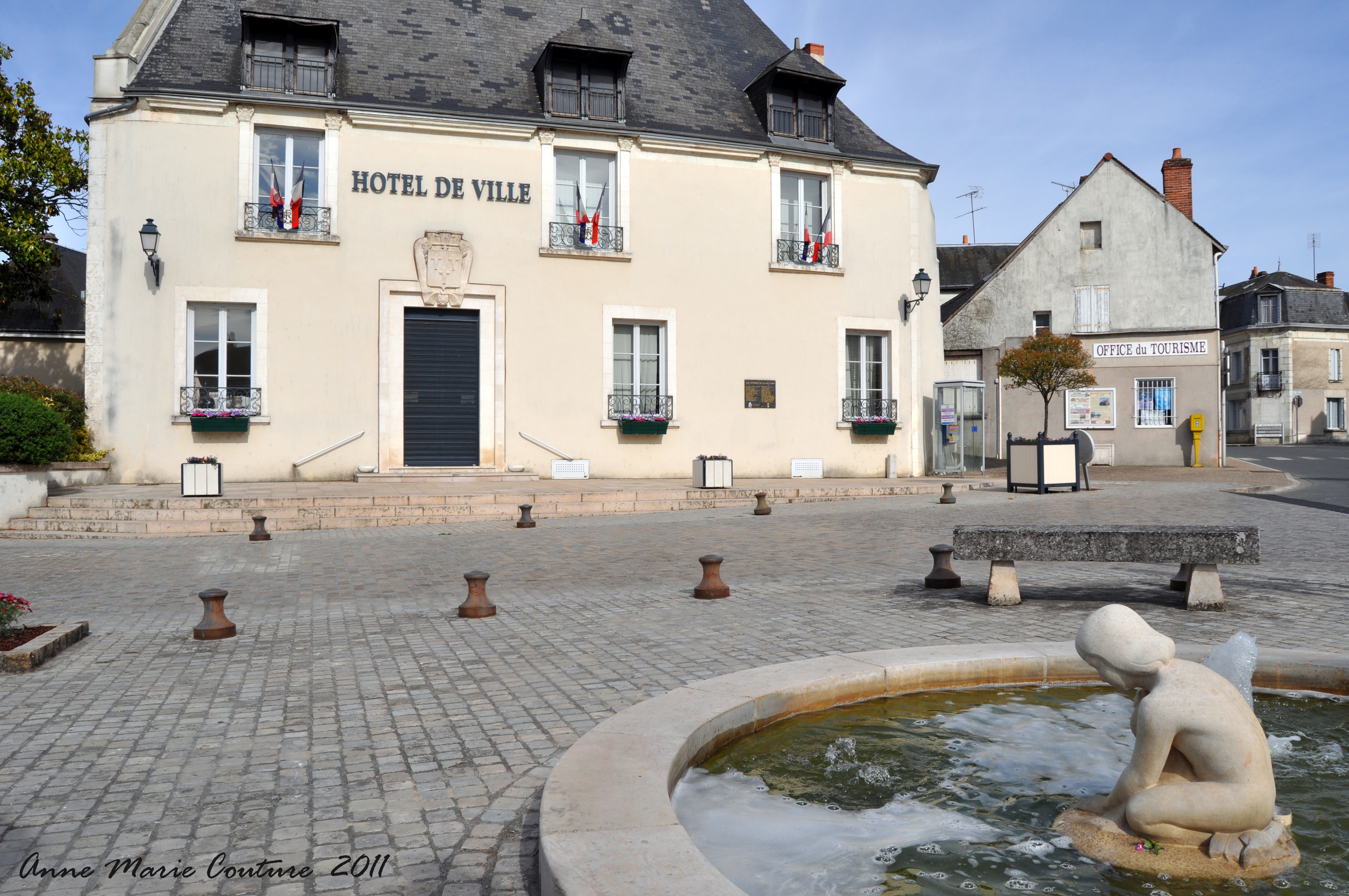
- Town hall

- Coat of arms
- Location of Écueillé
- Location within France Location within Centre-Val de Loire
- Coordinates: 47°05′06″N 1°20′50″E
- Country: France
- Region: Centre-Val de Loire
- Department: Indre
- Arrondissement: Châteauroux
- Canton: Valençay
- Intercommunality: Écueillé-Valençay

Government
  - Mayor (2020–2026): Jean Aufrère
- Area^{1}: 34.9 km^{2} (13.5 sq mi)
- Elevation: 145 m (476 ft)
- Highest elevation: 187 m (614 ft)
- Lowest elevation: 119 m (390 ft)
- Population (2023): 1,188
  - Density: 34.0/km^{2} (88.2/sq mi)
- Time zone: UTC+01:00 (CET)
  - Summer (DST): UTC+02:00 (CEST)
- INSEE/Postal code: 36069 /36240
- ^{1} French Land Register data, which excludes lakes, ponds, glaciers > 1 km^{2} (0.386 sq mi or 247 acres) and river estuaries.

Écueillé (French pronunciation: [ekœje]) is a commune in the Indre department, central France.

== Population ==
Historical population
Year	Pop.	±% p.a.
1968	1,689	—
1975	1,760	+0.59%
1982	1,726	−0.28%
1990	1,548	−1.35%
1999	1,413	−1.01%
2007	1,333	−0.73%
2012	1,302	−0.47%
2017	1,261	−0.64%
2023	1,188	−0.99%
Source: INSEE

== See also ==
- Communes of the Indre department
