= Luçay-le-Mâle =

- Commune
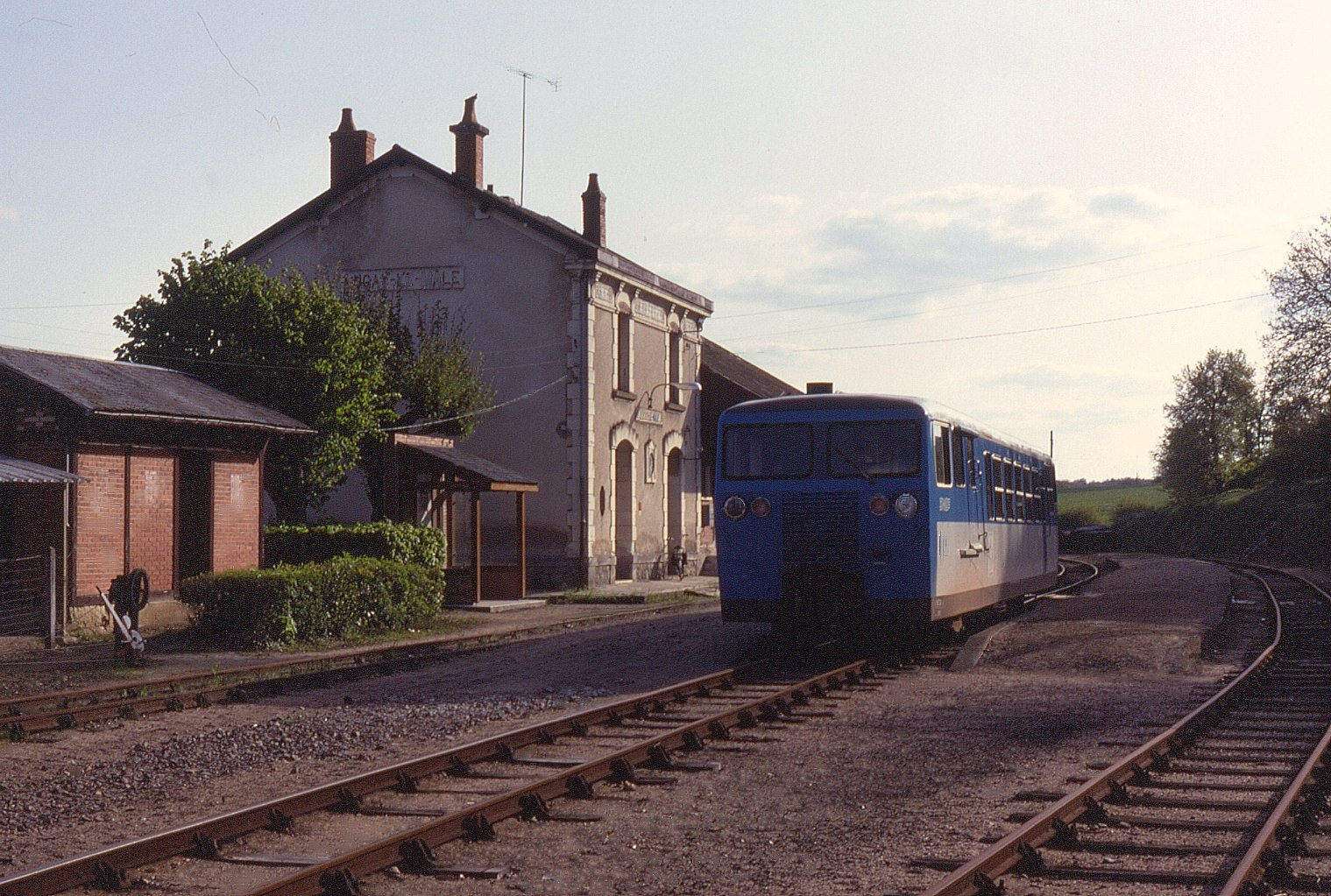
- The train station in 1992

- Coat of arms
- Location of Luçay-le-Mâle
- Location within France Location within Centre-Val de Loire
- Coordinates: 47°07′51″N 1°26′32″E
- Country: France
- Region: Centre-Val de Loire
- Department: Indre
- Arrondissement: Châteauroux
- Canton: Valençay
- Intercommunality: Écueillé-Valençay

Government
  - Mayor (2020–2026): Bruno Taillandier
- Area^{1}: 68.08 km^{2} (26.29 sq mi)
- Elevation: 125 m (410 ft)
- Highest elevation: 182 m (597 ft)
- Lowest elevation: 97 m (318 ft)
- Population (2023): 1,324
  - Density: 19.45/km^{2} (50.37/sq mi)
- Time zone: UTC+01:00 (CET)
  - Summer (DST): UTC+02:00 (CEST)
- INSEE/Postal code: 36103 /36360
- ^{1} French Land Register data, which excludes lakes, ponds, glaciers > 1 km^{2} (0.386 sq mi or 247 acres) and river estuaries.

Luçay-le-Mâle (French pronunciation: [lysɛ lə mal]) is a commune in the Indre department in central France.

The Roman Catholic parish church is dedicated to Saint Maurice.

== Population ==
Historical population
Year	Pop.	±% p.a.
1968	2,008	—
1975	2,077	+0.48%
1982	2,334	+1.68%
1990	2,160	−0.96%
1999	1,706	−2.59%
2007	1,531	−1.34%
2012	1,456	−1.00%
2017	1,366	−1.27%
2023	1,324	−0.52%
Source: INSEE

== See also ==
- Communes of the Indre department
