= Veuil =

- Commune
- Coat of arms
- Location of Veuil
- Location within France Location within Centre-Val de Loire
- Coordinates: 47°07′20″N 1°31′33″E
- Country: France
- Region: Centre-Val de Loire
- Department: Indre
- Arrondissement: Châteauroux
- Canton: Valençay

Government
  - Mayor (2020–2026): Joël Rety
- Area^{1}: 18.84 km^{2} (7.27 sq mi)
- Elevation: 130 m (430 ft)
- Highest elevation: 158 m (518 ft)
- Lowest elevation: 97 m (318 ft)
- Population (2023): 379
  - Density: 20.1/km^{2} (52.1/sq mi)
- Time zone: UTC+01:00 (CET)
  - Summer (DST): UTC+02:00 (CEST)
- INSEE/Postal code: 36235 /36600
- ^{1} French Land Register data, which excludes lakes, ponds, glaciers > 1 km^{2} (0.386 sq mi or 247 acres) and river estuaries.

Veuil (French pronunciation: [vœj]) is a commune in the Indre department in central France.

== Population ==
Historical population
Year	Pop.	±% p.a.
1968	395	—
1975	375	−0.74%
1982	370	−0.19%
1990	386	+0.53%
1999	364	−0.65%
2007	367	+0.10%
2012	384	+0.91%
2017	376	−0.42%
2023	379	+0.13%
Source: INSEE

== See also ==
- Communes of the Indre department
