= Lye, Indre =

Lye
- Commune
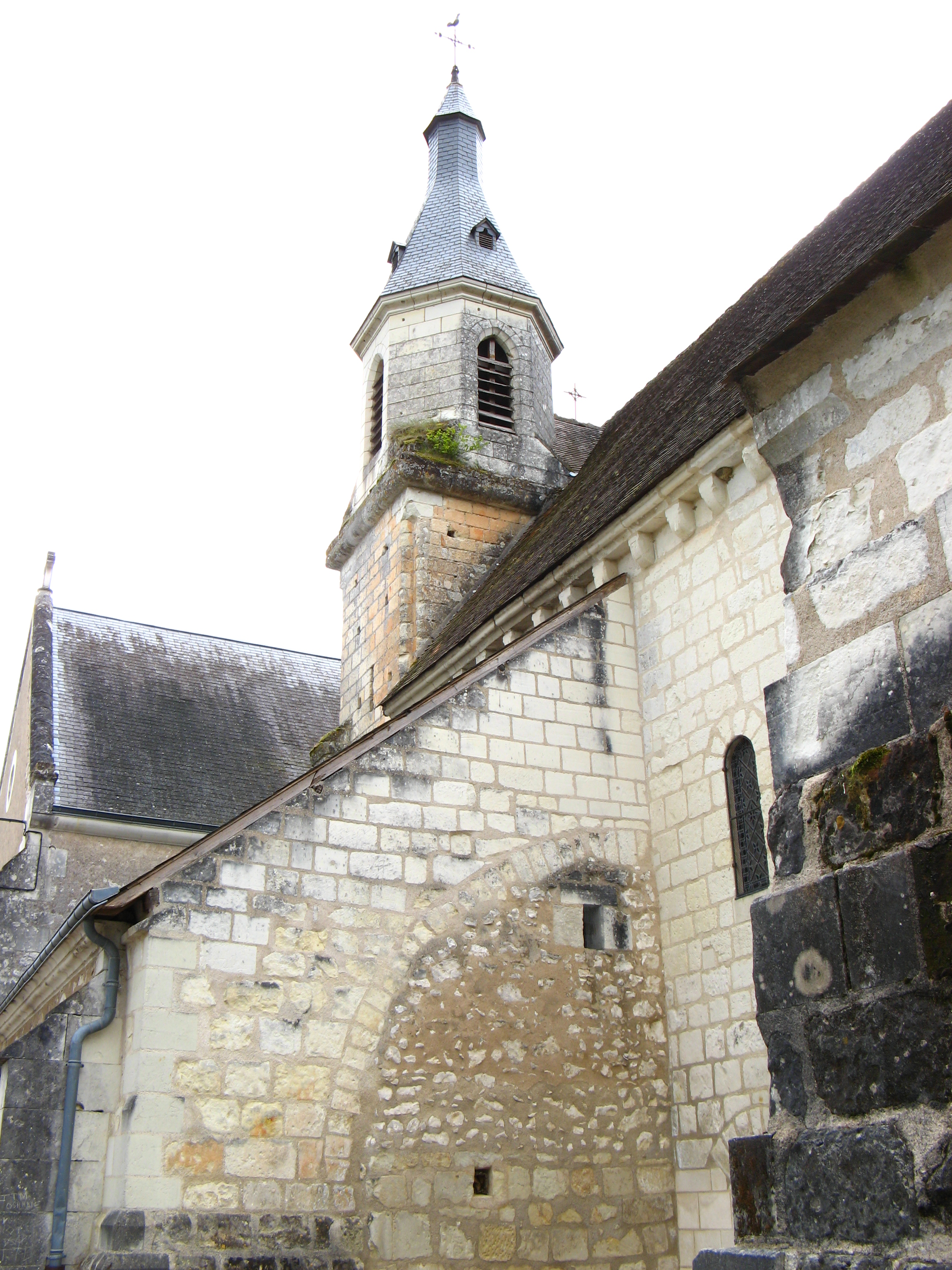
- The Church of Notre-Dame, in Lye

- Coat of arms
- Location of Lye
- Location within France Location within Centre-Val de Loire
- Coordinates: 47°13′43″N 1°28′28″E
- Country: France
- Region: Centre-Val de Loire
- Department: Indre
- Arrondissement: Châteauroux
- Canton: Valençay

Government
  - Mayor (2020–2026): Francis Jourdain
- Area^{1}: 24.77 km^{2} (9.56 sq mi)
- Elevation: 70 m (230 ft)
- Highest elevation: 136 m (446 ft)
- Lowest elevation: 76 m (249 ft)
- Population (2023): 758
  - Density: 30.6/km^{2} (79.3/sq mi)
- Time zone: UTC+01:00 (CET)
  - Summer (DST): UTC+02:00 (CEST)
- INSEE/Postal code: 36107 /36600
- ^{1} French Land Register data, which excludes lakes, ponds, glaciers > 1 km^{2} (0.386 sq mi or 247 acres) and river estuaries.

Lye (French pronunciation: [li]) is a commune in the Indre department in central France.

== Population ==
Historical population
Year	Pop.	±% p.a.
1968	997	—
1975	924	−1.08%
1982	932	+0.12%
1990	850	−1.14%
1999	802	−0.64%
2007	829	+0.41%
2012	851	+0.53%
2017	740	−2.76%
2023	758	+0.40%
Source: INSEE

== See also ==
- Communes of the Indre department
