= Jeu-Maloches =

- Commune
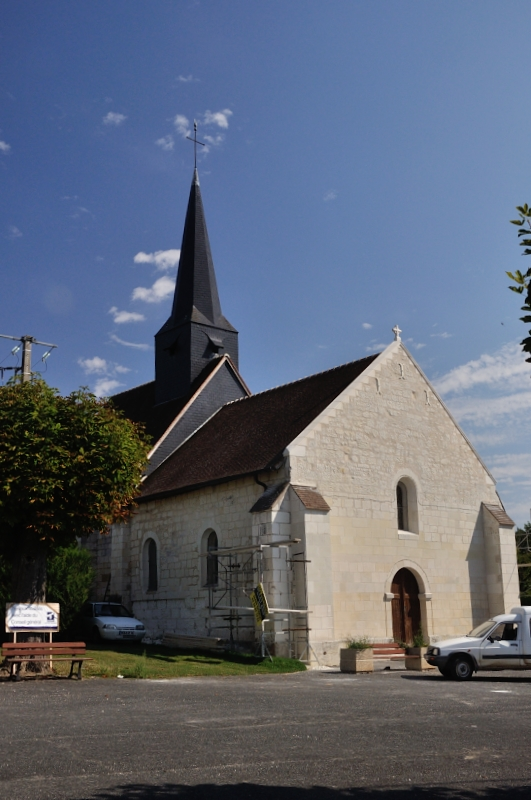
- The church of Saint-Sulpice, in Jeu-Maloches
- Location of Jeu-Maloches
- Location within France Location within Centre-Val de Loire
- Coordinates: 47°02′17″N 1°27′32″E
- Country: France
- Region: Centre-Val de Loire
- Department: Indre
- Arrondissement: Châteauroux
- Canton: Valençay
- Intercommunality: Écueillé-Valençay

Government
  - Mayor (2024–2026): Dominique Pinon
- Area^{1}: 12.73 km^{2} (4.92 sq mi)
- Elevation: 134 m (440 ft)
- Highest elevation: 189 m (620 ft)
- Lowest elevation: 127 m (417 ft)
- Population (2023): 116
  - Density: 9.11/km^{2} (23.6/sq mi)
- Time zone: UTC+01:00 (CET)
  - Summer (DST): UTC+02:00 (CEST)
- INSEE/Postal code: 36090 /36240
- ^{1} French Land Register data, which excludes lakes, ponds, glaciers > 1 km^{2} (0.386 sq mi or 247 acres) and river estuaries.

Jeu-Maloches (French pronunciation: [ʒø malɔʃ]) is a commune in the Indre department in central France.

== Population ==
Historical population
Year	Pop.	±% p.a.
1968	230	—
1975	190	−2.69%
1982	175	−1.17%
1990	160	−1.11%
1999	121	−3.06%
2007	131	+1.00%
2012	129	−0.31%
2017	127	−0.31%
2023	116	−1.50%
Source: INSEE

== See also ==
- Communes of the Indre department
