= Villentrois-Faverolles-en-Berry =

- Commune
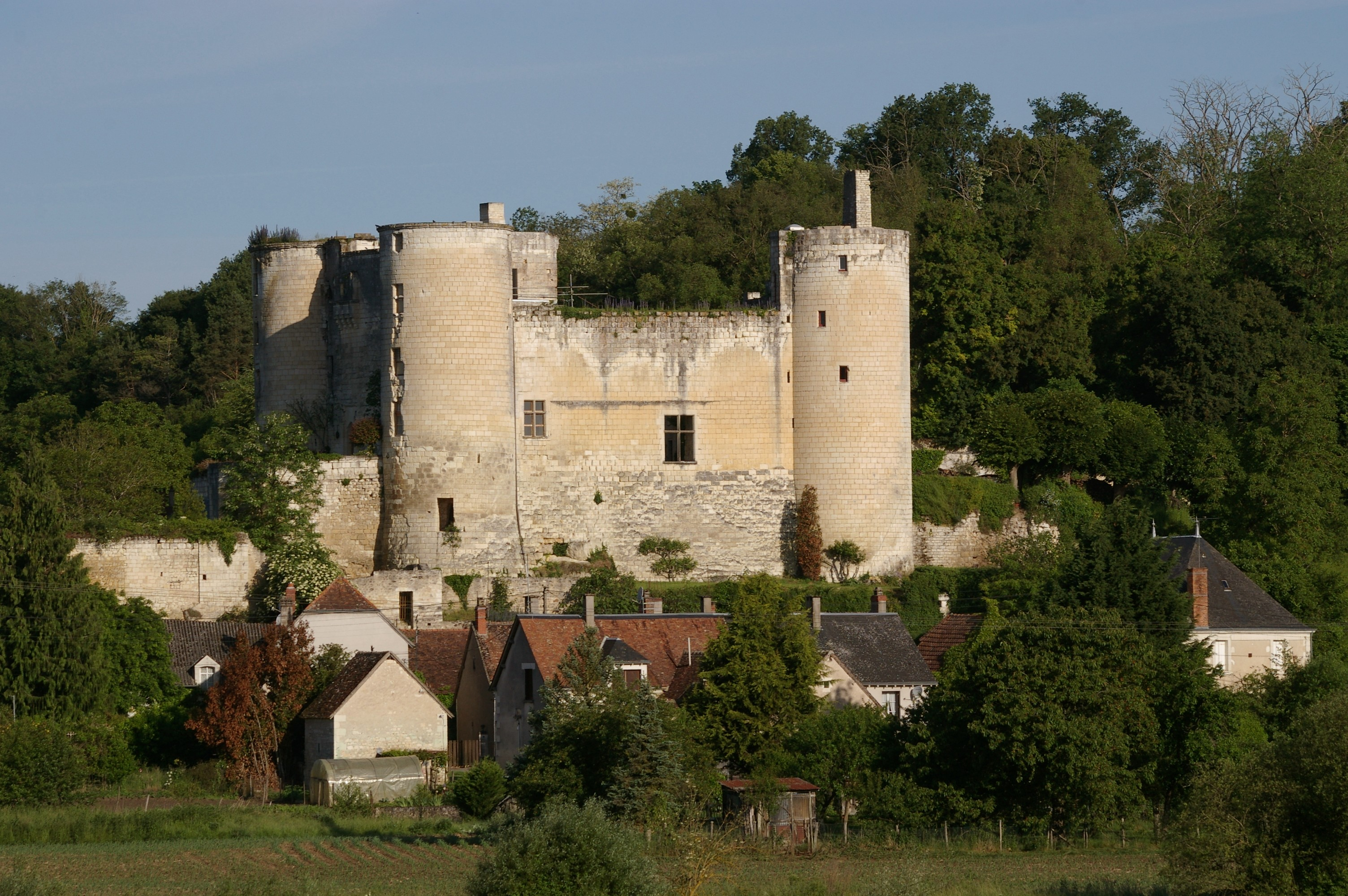
- Chateau
- Location of Villentrois-Faverolles-en-Berry
- Location within France Location within Centre-Val de Loire
- Coordinates: 47°11′41″N 1°27′48″E
- Country: France
- Region: Centre-Val de Loire
- Department: Indre
- Arrondissement: Châteauroux
- Canton: Valençay
- Intercommunality: Écueillé - Valençay

Government
  - Mayor (2025–2026): Jean-Paul Beccavin
- Area^{1}: 73.79 km^{2} (28.49 sq mi)
- Elevation: 93 m (305 ft)
- Highest elevation: 154 m (505 ft)
- Lowest elevation: 85 m (279 ft)
- Population (2023): 886
  - Density: 12.0/km^{2} (31.1/sq mi)
- Time zone: UTC+01:00 (CET)
  - Summer (DST): UTC+02:00 (CEST)
- INSEE/Postal code: 36244 /36600
- ^{1} French Land Register data, which excludes lakes, ponds, glaciers > 1 km^{2} (0.386 sq mi or 247 acres) and river estuaries.

Villentrois-Faverolles-en-Berry (French pronunciation: [vilɑ̃tʁwa favʁɔl ɑ̃ beʁi]) is a commune in the Indre department in central France. It was established on 1 January 2019 by merger of the former communes of Villentrois (the seat) and Faverolles-en-Berry.

== See also ==
- Communes of the Indre department
