= Vicq-sur-Nahon =

- Commune
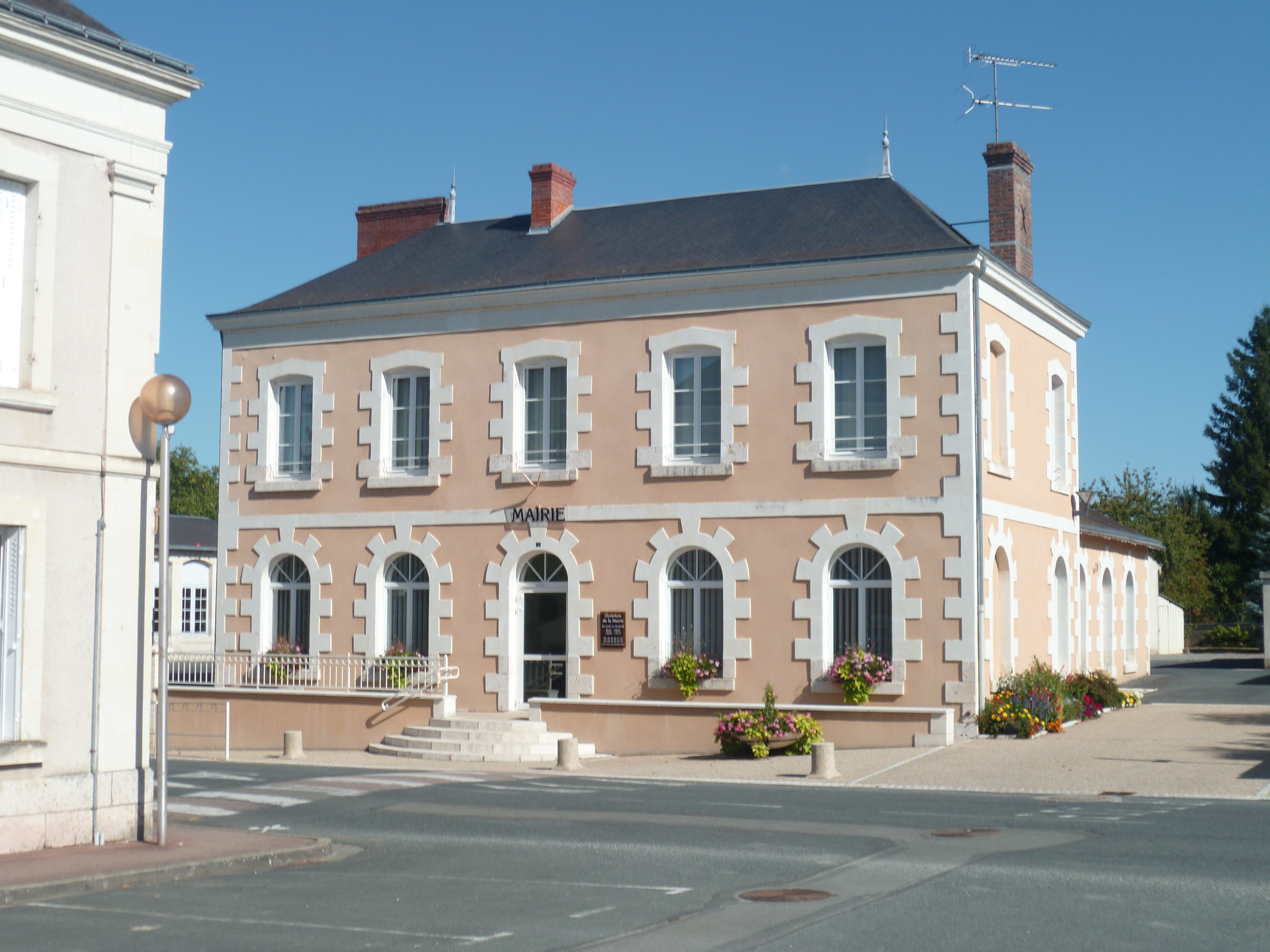
- The town hall in Vicq-Sur-Nahon
- Location of Vicq-sur-Nahon
- Location within France Location within Centre-Val de Loire
- Coordinates: 47°06′27″N 1°31′54″E
- Country: France
- Region: Centre-Val de Loire
- Department: Indre
- Arrondissement: Châteauroux
- Canton: Valençay
- Intercommunality: Écueillé-Valençay

Government
  - Mayor (2020–2026): Jean-Charles Guillet
- Area^{1}: 49.08 km^{2} (18.95 sq mi)
- Elevation: 116 m (381 ft)
- Highest elevation: 191 m (627 ft)
- Lowest elevation: 101 m (331 ft)
- Population (2023): 677
  - Density: 13.8/km^{2} (35.7/sq mi)
- Time zone: UTC+01:00 (CET)
  - Summer (DST): UTC+02:00 (CEST)
- INSEE/Postal code: 36237 /36600
- ^{1} French Land Register data, which excludes lakes, ponds, glaciers > 1 km^{2} (0.386 sq mi or 247 acres) and river estuaries.

Vicq-sur-Nahon (French pronunciation: [vik syʁ na.ɔ̃]) is a commune in the Indre department in central France.

== Population ==
Historical population
Year	Pop.	±% p.a.
1968	972	—
1975	934	−0.57%
1982	898	−0.56%
1990	810	−1.28%
1999	778	−0.45%
2007	754	−0.39%
2012	778	+0.63%
2017	729	−1.29%
2023	677	−1.23%
Source: INSEE

== Toponymy ==
The inhabitants are called Vicquois in French.

== See also ==
- Communes of the Indre department
