= Sembleçay =

- Commune
- Location of Sembleçay
- Location within France Location within Centre-Val de Loire
- Coordinates: 47°13′22″N 1°40′59″E
- Country: France
- Region: Centre-Val de Loire
- Department: Indre
- Arrondissement: Issoudun
- Canton: Valençay
- Intercommunality: Chabris - Pays de Bazelle

Government
  - Mayor (2020–2026): Christelle Barboux Malet
- Area^{1}: 8.08 km^{2} (3.12 sq mi)
- Elevation: 100 m (330 ft)
- Highest elevation: 123 m (404 ft)
- Lowest elevation: 81 m (266 ft)
- Population (2023): 100
  - Density: 12/km^{2} (32/sq mi)
- Time zone: UTC+01:00 (CET)
  - Summer (DST): UTC+02:00 (CEST)
- INSEE/Postal code: 36217 /36210
- ^{1} French Land Register data, which excludes lakes, ponds, glaciers > 1 km^{2} (0.386 sq mi or 247 acres) and river estuaries.

Sembleçay (French pronunciation: [sɑ̃bləsɛ]) is a commune in the Indre department in central France.

== Population ==
Historical population
Year	Pop.	±% p.a.
1968	150	—
1975	125	−2.57%
1982	113	−1.43%
1990	102	−1.27%
1999	106	+0.43%
2007	116	+1.13%
2012	102	−2.54%
2017	101	−0.20%
2023	100	−0.17%
Source: INSEE

== See also ==
- Communes of the Indre department
