= Menetou-sur-Nahon =

- Commune
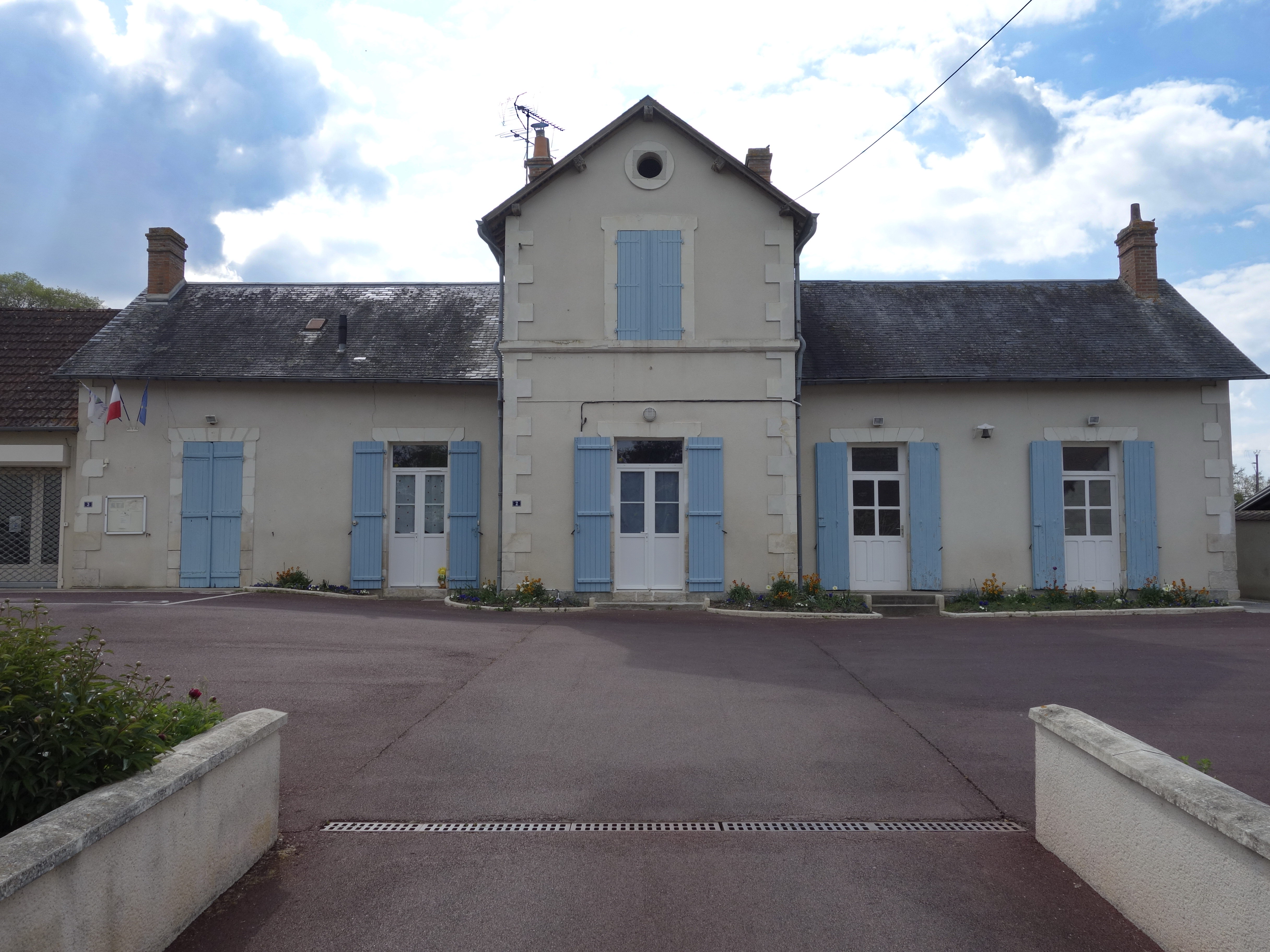
- Town hall
- Location of Menetou-sur-Nahon
- Location within France Location within Centre-Val de Loire
- Coordinates: 47°13′10″N 1°38′59″E
- Country: France
- Region: Centre-Val de Loire
- Department: Indre
- Arrondissement: Issoudun
- Canton: Valençay

Government
  - Mayor (2020–2026): Jean Bonnin
- Area^{1}: 6.98 km^{2} (2.69 sq mi)
- Elevation: 60 m (200 ft)
- Highest elevation: 116 m (381 ft)
- Lowest elevation: 79 m (259 ft)
- Population (2023): 132
  - Density: 18.9/km^{2} (49.0/sq mi)
- Time zone: UTC+01:00 (CET)
  - Summer (DST): UTC+02:00 (CEST)
- INSEE/Postal code: 36115 /36210
- ^{1} French Land Register data, which excludes lakes, ponds, glaciers > 1 km^{2} (0.386 sq mi or 247 acres) and river estuaries.

Menetou-sur-Nahon is a commune in the Indre department in central France.

== Population ==
Historical population
Year	Pop.	±% p.a.
1968	191	—
1975	146	−3.77%
1982	108	−4.22%
1990	102	−0.71%
1999	113	+1.14%
2007	108	−0.56%
2012	122	+2.47%
2017	118	−0.66%
2023	132	+1.89%
Source: INSEE

== See also ==
- Communes of the Indre department
