= Bagneux, Indre =

Bagneux
- Commune
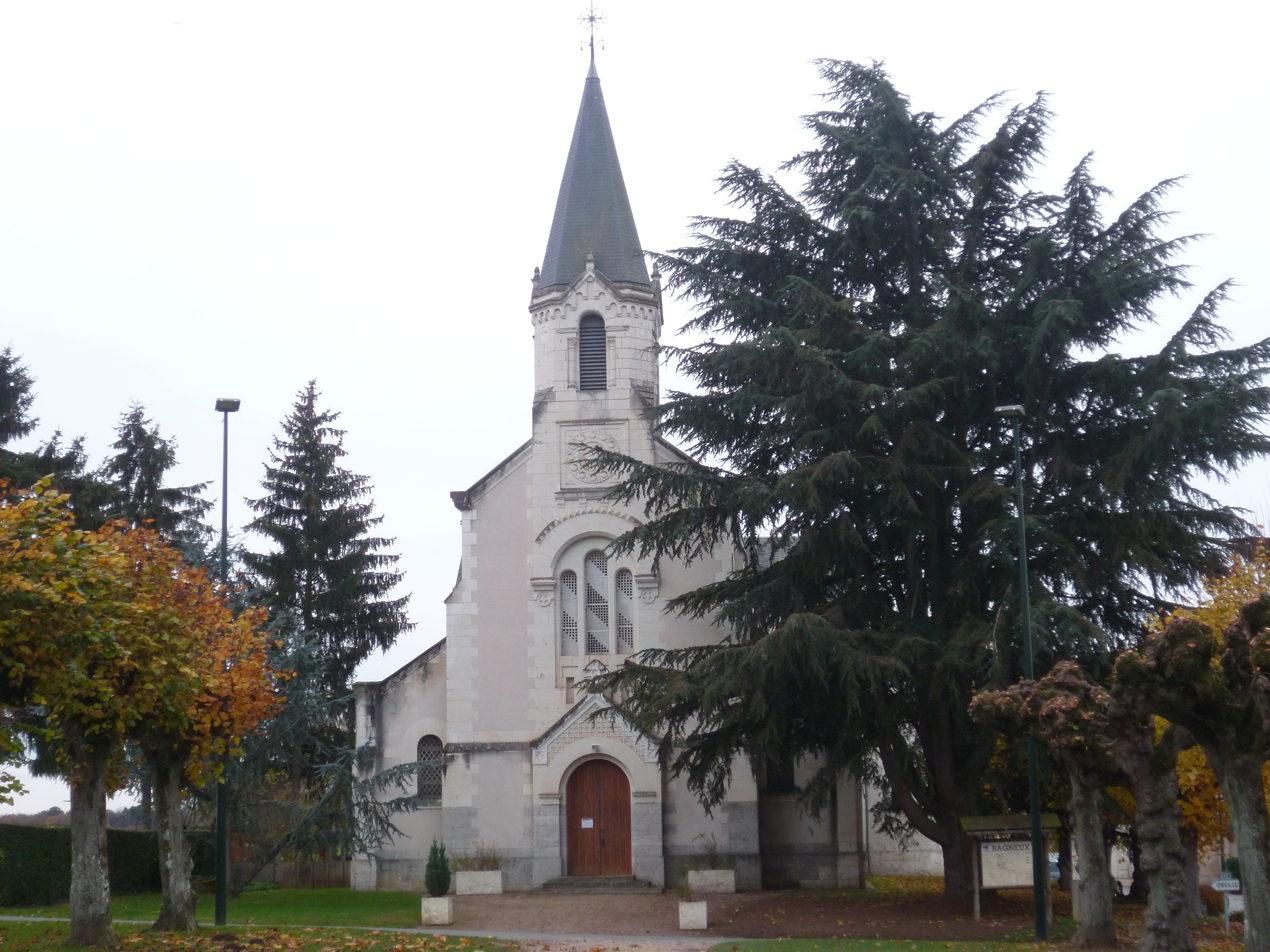
- The church in Bagneux
- Location of Bagneux
- Location within France Location within Centre-Val de Loire
- Coordinates: 47°11′02″N 1°45′14″E
- Country: France
- Region: Centre-Val de Loire
- Department: Indre
- Arrondissement: Issoudun
- Canton: Valençay

Government
  - Mayor (2020–2026): Michel Petit
- Area^{1}: 25.3 km^{2} (9.8 sq mi)
- Elevation: 143 m (469 ft)
- Highest elevation: 146 m (479 ft)
- Lowest elevation: 92 m (302 ft)
- Population (2023): 172
  - Density: 6.80/km^{2} (17.6/sq mi)
- Time zone: UTC+01:00 (CET)
  - Summer (DST): UTC+02:00 (CEST)
- INSEE/Postal code: 36011 /36210
- ^{1} French Land Register data, which excludes lakes, ponds, glaciers > 1 km^{2} (0.386 sq mi or 247 acres) and river estuaries.

Bagneux (French pronunciation: [baɲø]) is a commune in the Indre département in central France.

== Population ==
Historical population
Year	Pop.	±% p.a.
1968	287	—
1975	242	−2.41%
1982	193	−3.18%
1990	169	−1.65%
1999	174	+0.32%
2007	189	+1.04%
2012	186	−0.32%
2017	174	−1.32%
2023	172	−0.19%
Source: INSEE

== See also ==
- Communes of the Indre department
