= Val-Fouzon =

- Commune
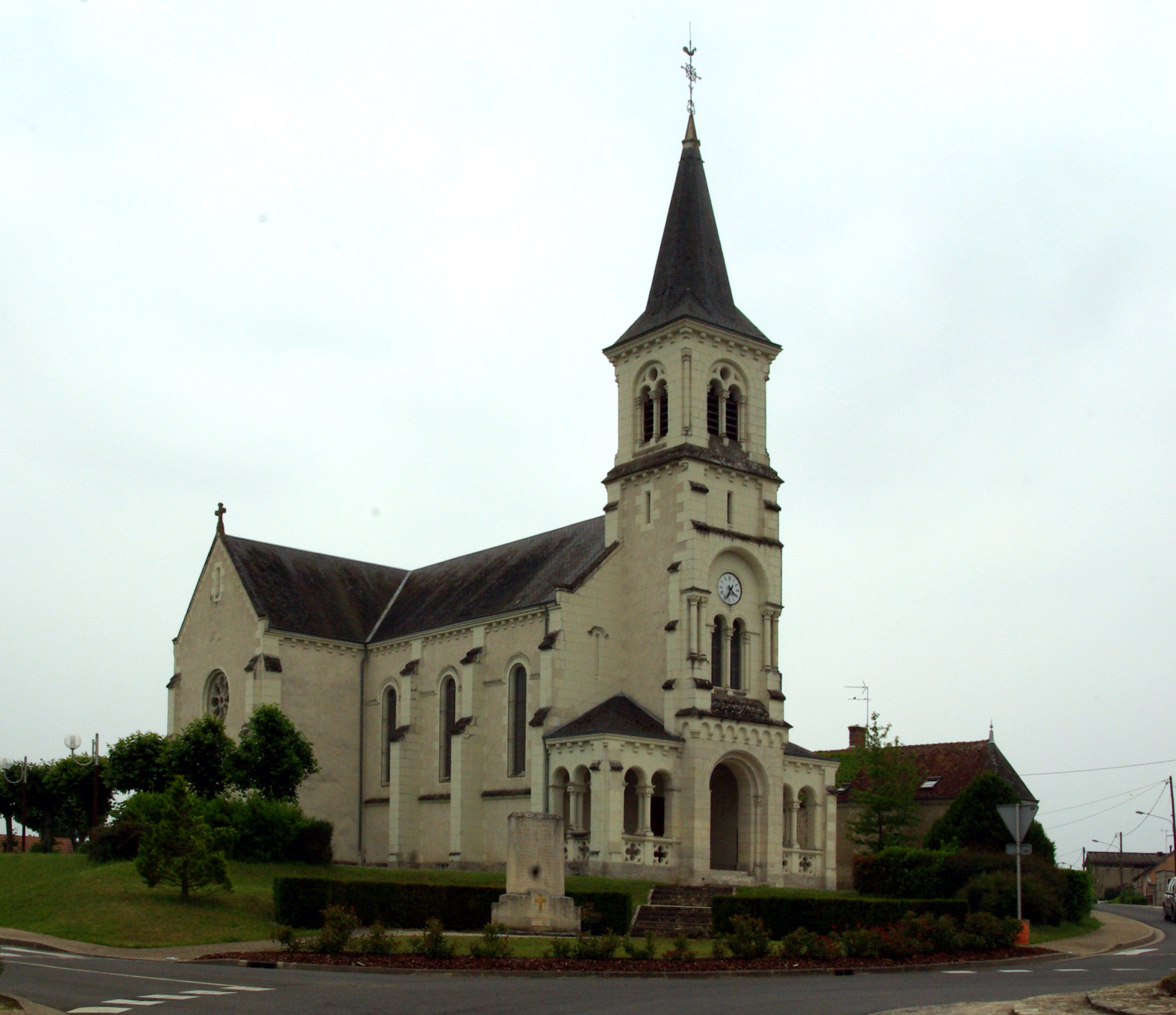
- The church of Varennes-sur-Fouzon in 2010
- Location of Val-Fouzon
- Location within France Location within Centre-Val de Loire
- Coordinates: 47°12′50″N 1°36′18″E
- Country: France
- Region: Centre-Val de Loire
- Department: Indre
- Arrondissement: Issoudun
- Canton: Valençay

Government
  - Mayor (2020–2026): Philippe Jourdain
- Area^{1}: 46.90 km^{2} (18.11 sq mi)
- Population (2023): 968
  - Density: 20.6/km^{2} (53.5/sq mi)
- Time zone: UTC+01:00 (CET)
  - Summer (DST): UTC+02:00 (CEST)
- INSEE/Postal code: 36229 /36210
- ^{1} French Land Register data, which excludes lakes, ponds, glaciers > 1 km^{2} (0.386 sq mi or 247 acres) and river estuaries.

Val-Fouzon (French pronunciation: [val fuzɔ̃]) is a commune in the Indre department of central France. The municipality was established on 1 January 2016 by merger of the former communes of Varennes-sur-Fouzon, Parpeçay and Sainte-Cécile. It takes its name from the river Fouzon.

== See also ==
- Communes of the Indre department
