= Varennes-sur-Usson =

- Commune
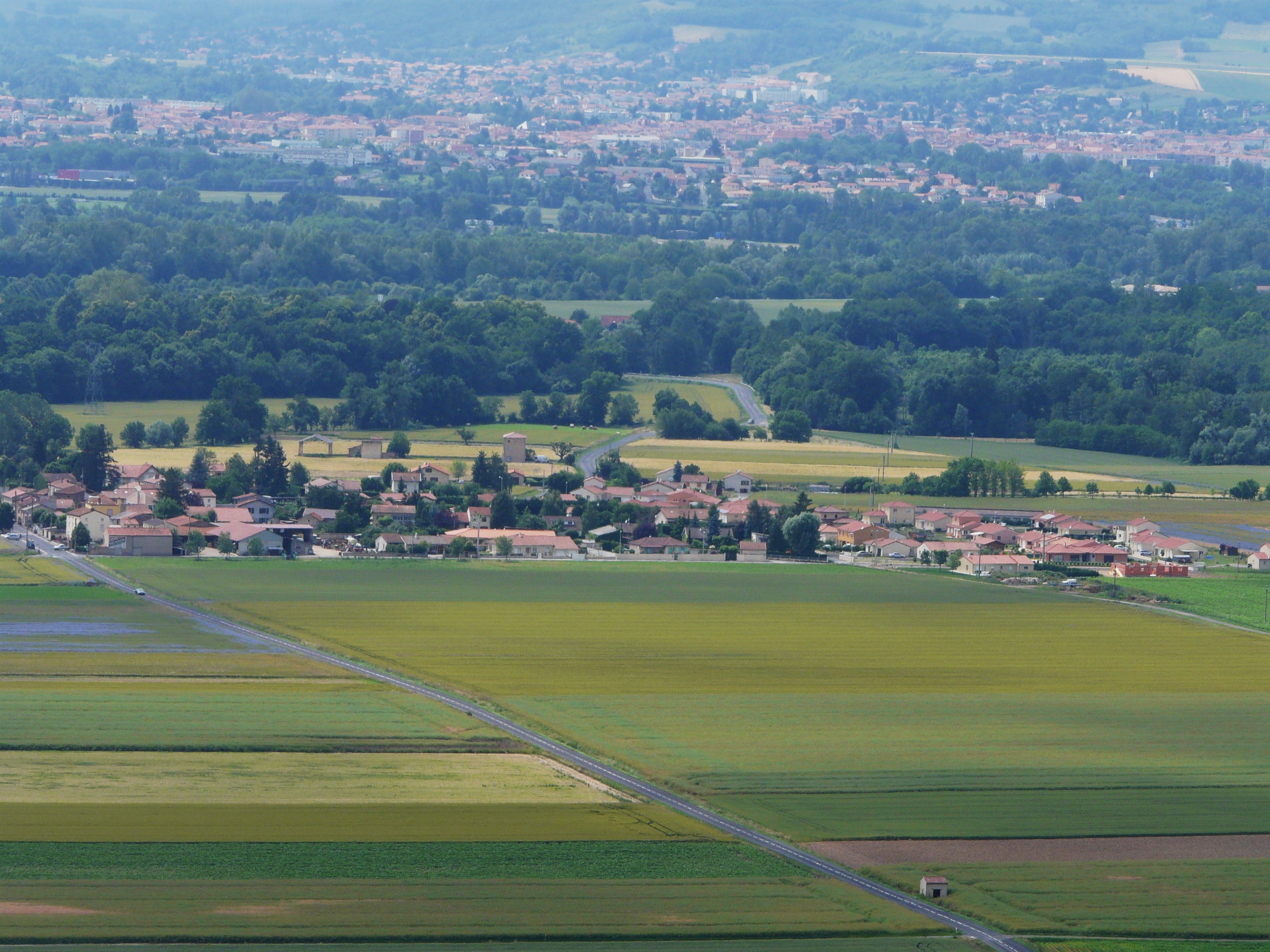
- A general view of Varennes-sur-Usson
- Location of Varennes-sur-Usson
- Location within France Location within Auvergne-Rhône-Alpes
- Coordinates: 45°31′59″N 3°18′22″E
- Country: France
- Region: Auvergne-Rhône-Alpes
- Department: Puy-de-Dôme
- Arrondissement: Issoire
- Canton: Brassac-les-Mines
- Intercommunality: Agglo Pays d'Issoire

Government
  - Mayor (2026–32): Thierry Aigouy
- Area^{1}: 6.15 km^{2} (2.37 sq mi)
- Highest elevation: 522 m (1,713 ft)
- Lowest elevation: 376 m (1,234 ft)
- Population (2023): 317
  - Density: 51.5/km^{2} (134/sq mi)
- Time zone: UTC+01:00 (CET)
  - Summer (DST): UTC+02:00 (CEST)
- INSEE/Postal code: 63444 /63500
- ^{1} French Land Register data, which excludes lakes, ponds, glaciers > 1 km^{2} (0.386 sq mi or 247 acres) and river estuaries.

Varennes-sur-Usson (French pronunciation: [vaʁɛn syʁ ysɔ̃], literally Varennes on Usson; Auvergnat: Varènas) is a commune in the Puy-de-Dôme department in Auvergne in central France.

== See also ==
- Communes of the Puy-de-Dôme department
