= Bagneux British Cemetery =

CWGC Cemetery in Somme, northern France

Coordinates: 50.1341°N 2.3136°E

Bagneux British Cemetery is a Commonwealth War Graves Commission cemetery in the département of the Somme, in Picardy in northern France. It lies to the south of the village of Gezaincourt, near the town of Doullens. It was established in April 1918 following the end of the German offensive in Picardy, and was formally laid out by Sir Edwin Lutyens. There are 1,374 Commonwealth service personnel of World War I buried here, comprising:

- 1,145 British
- 181 New Zealanders
- 46 Canadians
- 1 Australian
- 1 British Indian

The dead were principally from two British and a Canadian field hospital. Several graves in Plot III, Row A, were of casualties from a German air raid on Doullens on 30 May 1918.
