= Canton of Valençay =

Coordinates: 47.16°N 1.56°E

The canton of Valençay is an administrative division of the Indre department, central France. Its borders were modified at the French canton reorganisation which came into effect in March 2015. Its seat is in Valençay.

It consists of the following communes:

1. Anjouin
2. Bagneux
3. Chabris
4. Dun-le-Poëlier
5. Écueillé
6. Fontguenand
7. Frédille
8. Gehée
9. Heugnes
10. Jeu-Maloches
11. Langé
12. Luçay-le-Mâle
13. Lye
14. Menetou-sur-Nahon
15. Orville
16. Pellevoisin
17. Poulaines
18. Préaux
19. Saint-Christophe-en-Bazelle
20. Selles-sur-Nahon
21. Sembleçay
22. Valençay
23. Val-Fouzon
24. La Vernelle
25. Veuil
26. Vicq-sur-Nahon
27. Villegouin
28. Villentrois-Faverolles-en-Berry
