= Champillet =

- Commune
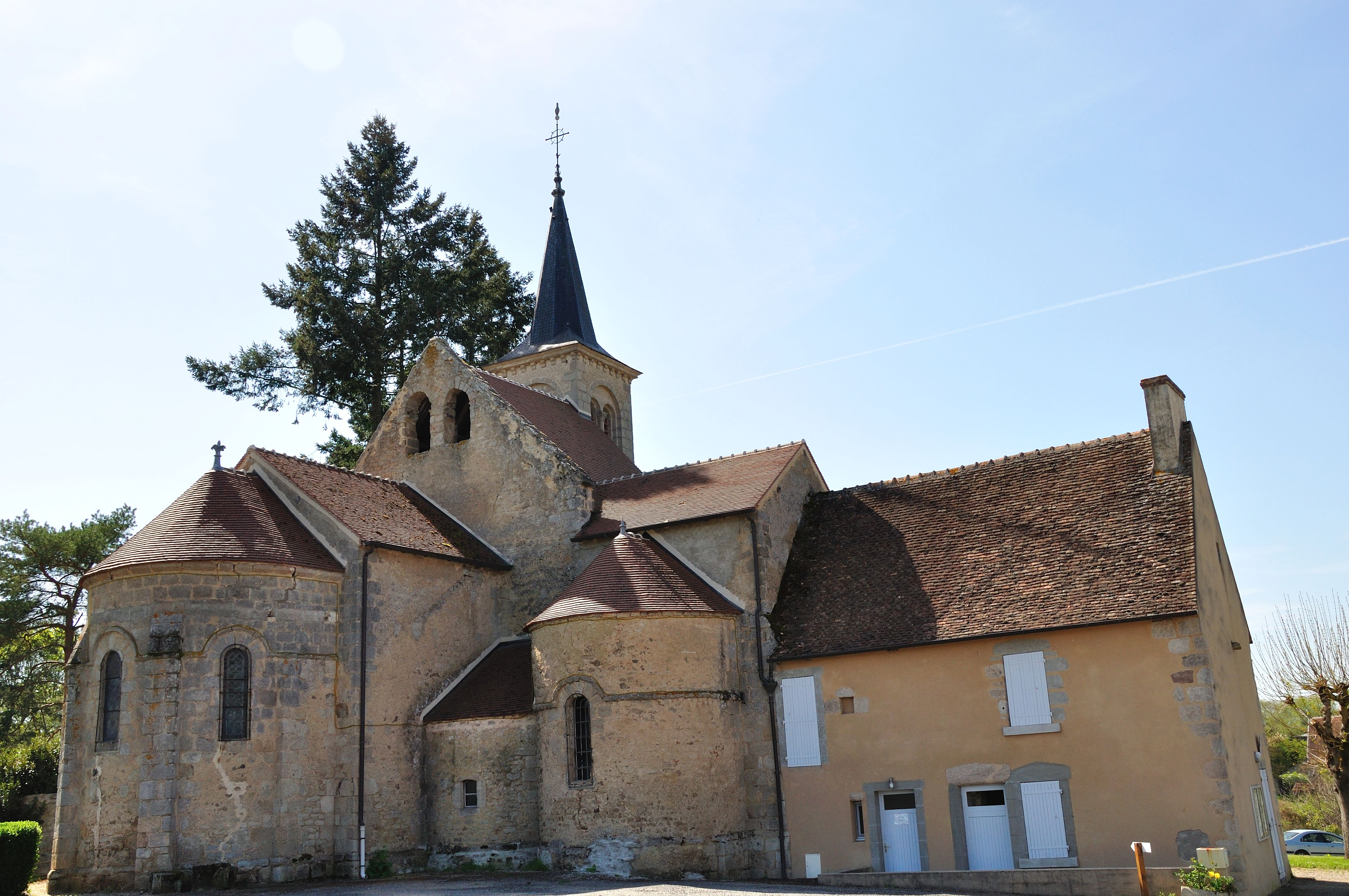
- The Church of Saint-Pierre and the town hall, in Champillet
- Location of Champillet
- Location within France Location within Centre-Val de Loire
- Coordinates: 46°32′55″N 2°06′53″E
- Country: France
- Region: Centre-Val de Loire
- Department: Indre
- Arrondissement: La Châtre
- Canton: La Châtre
- Intercommunality: La Châtre et Sainte-Sévère

Government
  - Mayor (2020–2026): Michel Salmon
- Area^{1}: 6.94 km^{2} (2.68 sq mi)
- Elevation: 250 m (820 ft)
- Highest elevation: 289 m (948 ft)
- Lowest elevation: 224 m (735 ft)
- Population (2023): 136
  - Density: 19.6/km^{2} (50.8/sq mi)
- Time zone: UTC+01:00 (CET)
  - Summer (DST): UTC+02:00 (CEST)
- INSEE/Postal code: 36038 /36160
- ^{1} French Land Register data, which excludes lakes, ponds, glaciers > 1 km^{2} (0.386 sq mi or 247 acres) and river estuaries.

Champillet (French pronunciation: [ʃɑ̃pijɛ]) is a commune in the Indre department in central France.

== Population ==
Historical population
Year	Pop.	±% p.a.
1968	190	—
1975	173	−1.33%
1982	168	−0.42%
1990	144	−1.91%
1999	154	+0.75%
2007	159	+0.40%
2012	152	−0.90%
2017	153	+0.13%
2023	136	−1.94%
Source: INSEE

== See also ==
- Communes of the Indre department
