= Canton of Tournon-Saint-Martin =

Coordinates: 46°44′07″N 0°57′18″E

Tournon-Saint-Martin
- Former canton
- Interactive map of Tournon-Saint-Martin
- Country: France
- Region: Centre-Val de Loire
- Department: Indre
- No. of communes: {{{nbcomm}}}
- Disbanded: 2015
- Area: 212.42 km^{2} (82.02 sq mi)
- Population (2012): 4,550
  - Density: 21.4/km^{2} (55.5/sq mi)

The Canton of Tournon-Saint-Martin is a former canton situated in the Indre département and in the Centre region of France. It was disbanded following the French canton reorganisation which came into effect in March 2015. It consisted of 10 communes, which joined the canton of Le Blanc in 2015. It had 4,550 inhabitants (2012).

The canton comprised the following communes:

- Fontgombault
- Lingé
- Lurais
- Lureuil
- Martizay
- Mérigny
- Néons-sur-Creuse
- Preuilly-la-Ville
- Sauzelles
- Tournon-Saint-Martin

== Demography ==
Historical population
Year	Pop.	±%
1962	5,652	—
1968	5,944	+5.2%
1975	5,428	−8.7%
1982	5,119	−5.7%
1990	4,945	−3.4%
1999	4,667	−5.6%
2006	4,713	+1.0%
2012	4,550	−3.5%

== See also ==
- Arrondissements of the Indre department
- Cantons of the Indre department
- Communes of the Indre department
