= Arrondissement of Le Blanc =

Coordinates: 46.63°N 1.07°E

Le Blanc
- Arrondissement
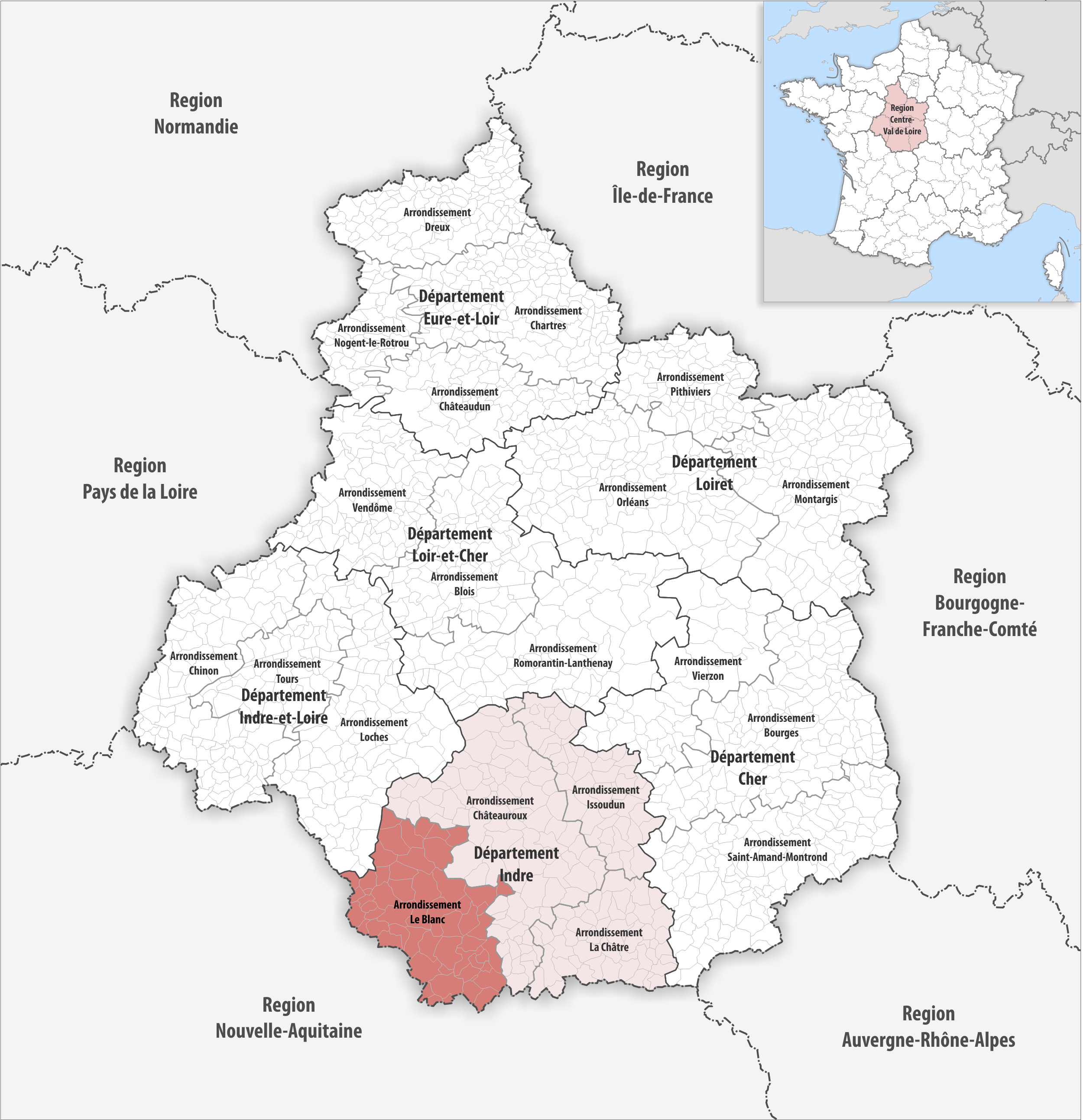
- Location within the region Centre-Val de Loire
- Country: France
- Region: Centre-Val de Loire
- Department: Indre
- No. of communes: {{{nbcomm}}}
- Area: 1,782.3 km^{2} (688.1 sq mi)
- Population (2023): 30,322
  - Density: 17.013/km^{2} (44.063/sq mi)
- INSEE code: 361

The arrondissement of Le Blanc is an arrondissement of France in the Indre department in the Centre-Val de Loire region. It has 57 communes. Its population is 30,501 (2021), and its area is 1,782.3 km^{2} (688.1 sq mi).

== Composition ==
The communes of the arrondissement of Le Blanc, and their INSEE codes, are:

1. Azay-le-Ferron (36010)
2. Beaulieu (36015)
3. Bélâbre (36016)
4. Le Blanc (36018)
5. Bonneuil (36020)
6. Chaillac (36035)
7. Chalais (36036)
8. La Châtre-Langlin (36047)
9. Chazelet (36049)
10. Chitray (36051)
11. Ciron (36053)
12. Concremiers (36058)
13. Douadic (36066)
14. Dunet (36067)
15. Fontgombault (36076)
16. Ingrandes (36087)
17. Lignac (36094)
18. Lingé (36096)
19. Lurais (36104)
20. Lureuil (36105)
21. Luzeret (36106)
22. Martizay (36113)
23. Mauvières (36114)
24. Mérigny (36119)
25. Mézières-en-Brenne (36123)
26. Migné (36124)
27. Mouhet (36134)
28. Néons-sur-Creuse (36137)
29. Nuret-le-Ferron (36144)
30. Obterre (36145)
31. Oulches (36148)
32. Parnac (36150)
33. Paulnay (36153)
34. La Pérouille (36157)
35. Pouligny-Saint-Pierre (36165)
36. Preuilly-la-Ville (36167)
37. Prissac (36168)
38. Rivarennes (36172)
39. Rosnay (36173)
40. Roussines (36174)
41. Ruffec (36176)
42. Sacierges-Saint-Martin (36177)
43. Saint-Aigny (36178)
44. Saint-Benoît-du-Sault (36182)
45. Saint-Civran (36187)
46. Sainte-Gemme (36193)
47. Saint-Gaultier (36192)
48. Saint-Gilles (36196)
49. Saint-Hilaire-sur-Benaize (36197)
50. Saint-Michel-en-Brenne (36204)
51. Saulnay (36212)
52. Sauzelles (36213)
53. Thenay (36220)
54. Tilly (36223)
55. Tournon-Saint-Martin (36224)
56. Vigoux (36239)
57. Villiers (36246)

== History ==
The arrondissement of Le Blanc was created in 1800. At the January 2017 reorganisation of the arrondissements of Indre, it gained the commune La Pérouille from the arrondissement of Châteauroux.

As a result of the reorganisation of the cantons of France which came into effect in 2015, the borders of the cantons are no longer related to the borders of the arrondissements. The cantons of the arrondissement of Le Blanc were, as of January 2015:

1. Bélâbre
2. Le Blanc
3. Mézières-en-Brenne
4. Saint-Benoît-du-Sault
5. Saint-Gaultier
6. Tournon-Saint-Martin
