= Rivarennes =

Rivarennes may refer to the following places in France:

- Rivarennes, Indre, a commune in the Indre department
- Rivarennes, Indre-et-Loire, a commune in the Indre-et-Loire department
