= Ruffec =

Ruffec may refer to the following places in France:

- Ruffec, Charente, a commune in the Charente department
- Ruffec, Indre, a commune in the Indre department
