= Tilly, Indre =

Tilly
- Commune
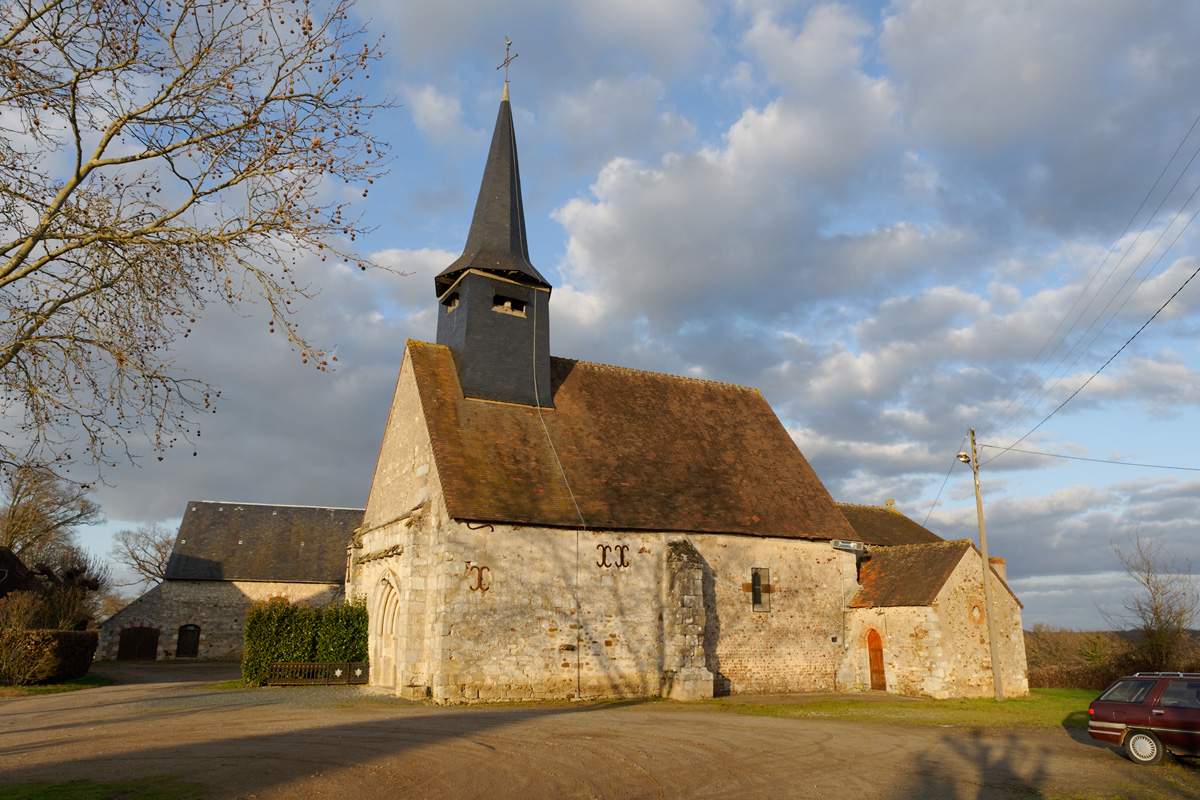
- The Church of our Lady, in Tilly
- Location of Tilly
- Location within France Location within Centre-Val de Loire
- Coordinates: 46°24′25″N 1°12′10″E
- Country: France
- Region: Centre-Val de Loire
- Department: Indre
- Arrondissement: Le Blanc
- Canton: Saint-Gaultier

Government
  - Mayor (2023–2026): Guylene Maussire
- Area^{1}: 14.77 km^{2} (5.70 sq mi)
- Elevation: 210 m (690 ft)
- Highest elevation: 221 m (725 ft)
- Lowest elevation: 143 m (469 ft)
- Population (2023): 133
  - Density: 9.00/km^{2} (23.3/sq mi)
- Time zone: UTC+01:00 (CET)
  - Summer (DST): UTC+02:00 (CEST)
- INSEE/Postal code: 36223 /36310
- ^{1} French Land Register data, which excludes lakes, ponds, glaciers > 1 km^{2} (0.386 sq mi or 247 acres) and river estuaries.

Tilly is a commune in the Indre department in central France.

== Geography ==
The commune is located in the parc naturel régional de la Brenne.

The river Benaize forms most of the commune's southern border.

== Population ==
Historical population
Year	Pop.	±% p.a.
1968	306	—
1975	279	−1.31%
1982	229	−2.78%
1990	198	−1.80%
1999	189	−0.52%
2007	169	−1.39%
2012	152	−2.10%
2017	137	−2.06%
2023	133	−0.49%
Source: INSEE

== See also ==
- Communes of the Indre department
