= Obterre =

- Commune
- Location of Obterre
- Location within France Location within Centre-Val de Loire
- Coordinates: 46°54′56″N 1°02′16″E
- Country: France
- Region: Centre-Val de Loire
- Department: Indre
- Arrondissement: Le Blanc
- Canton: Le Blanc
- Intercommunality: Cœur de Brenne

Government
  - Mayor (2020–2026): Jacques Prouteau
- Area^{1}: 28.47 km^{2} (10.99 sq mi)
- Elevation: 120 m (390 ft)
- Highest elevation: 144 m (472 ft)
- Lowest elevation: 98 m (322 ft)
- Population (2023): 224
  - Density: 7.87/km^{2} (20.4/sq mi)
- Time zone: UTC+01:00 (CET)
  - Summer (DST): UTC+02:00 (CEST)
- INSEE/Postal code: 36145 /36290
- ^{1} French Land Register data, which excludes lakes, ponds, glaciers > 1 km^{2} (0.386 sq mi or 247 acres) and river estuaries.

Obterre (French pronunciation: [ɔptɛʁ]) is a commune in the Indre department in central France.

== Geography ==
The commune is located in the parc naturel régional de la Brenne.

== Population ==
Historical population
Year	Pop.	±% p.a.
1968	429	—
1975	315	−4.32%
1982	280	−1.67%
1990	277	−0.13%
1999	267	−0.41%
2007	235	−1.58%
2012	251	+1.33%
2017	191	−5.32%
2023	224	+2.69%
Source: INSEE

== Points of Interest ==
- Haute Touche Zoological Park - Zoo in the commune that has been open to the public since 1980.

== See also ==
- Communes of the Indre department
