= Paulnay =

- Commune
- Location of Paulnay
- Location within France Location within Centre-Val de Loire
- Coordinates: 46°51′05″N 1°08′55″E
- Country: France
- Region: Centre-Val de Loire
- Department: Indre
- Arrondissement: Le Blanc
- Canton: Le Blanc
- Intercommunality: Cœur de Brenne

Government
  - Mayor (2020–2026): Sébastien Lalange
- Area^{1}: 38.48 km^{2} (14.86 sq mi)
- Elevation: 120 m (390 ft)
- Highest elevation: 149 m (489 ft)
- Lowest elevation: 88 m (289 ft)
- Population (2023): 348
  - Density: 9.04/km^{2} (23.4/sq mi)
- Time zone: UTC+01:00 (CET)
  - Summer (DST): UTC+02:00 (CEST)
- INSEE/Postal code: 36153 /36290
- ^{1} French Land Register data, which excludes lakes, ponds, glaciers > 1 km^{2} (0.386 sq mi or 247 acres) and river estuaries.

Paulnay is a commune in the Indre department in central France.

== Geography ==
The commune is located in the parc naturel régional de la Brenne.

== Population ==
Historical population
Year	Pop.	±% p.a.
1968	568	—
1975	472	−2.61%
1982	440	−1.00%
1990	382	−1.75%
1999	354	−0.84%
2007	358	+0.14%
2012	360	+0.11%
2017	323	−2.15%
2023	348	+1.25%
Source: INSEE

== See also ==
- Communes of the Indre department
