= La Pérouille =

- Commune
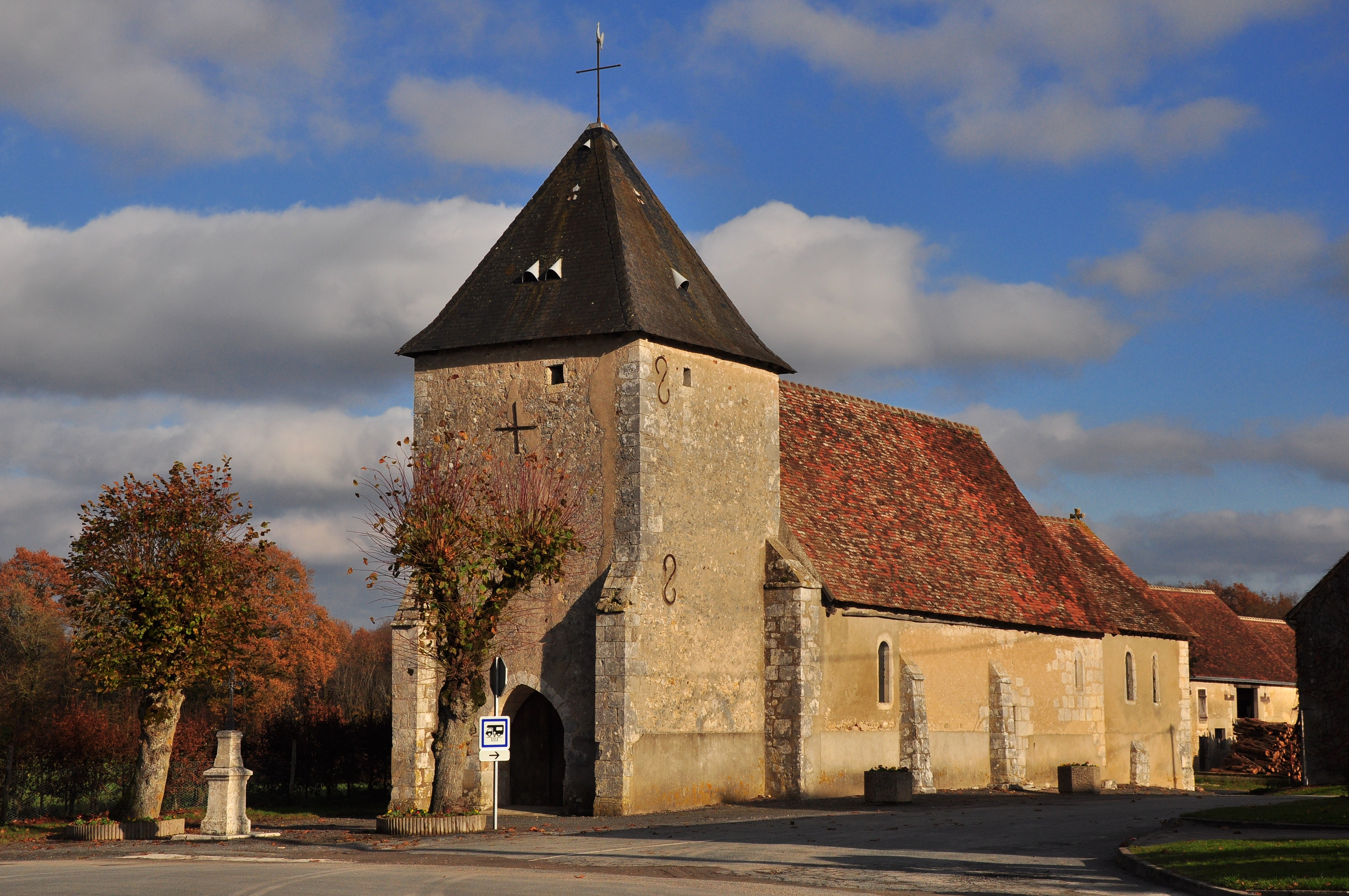
- The church of Saint-Martin, in La Pérouille
- Location of La Pérouille
- Location within France Location within Centre-Val de Loire
- Coordinates: 46°42′16″N 1°30′59″E
- Country: France
- Region: Centre-Val de Loire
- Department: Indre
- Arrondissement: Le Blanc
- Canton: Saint-Gaultier
- Intercommunality: Brenne Val de Creuse

Government
  - Mayor (2020–2026): Céline Brunet
- Area^{1}: 21.54 km^{2} (8.32 sq mi)
- Elevation: 150 m (490 ft)
- Highest elevation: 177 m (581 ft)
- Lowest elevation: 131 m (430 ft)
- Population (2023): 427
  - Density: 19.8/km^{2} (51.3/sq mi)
- Time zone: UTC+01:00 (CET)
  - Summer (DST): UTC+02:00 (CEST)
- INSEE/Postal code: 36157 /36350
- ^{1} French Land Register data, which excludes lakes, ponds, glaciers > 1 km^{2} (0.386 sq mi or 247 acres) and river estuaries.

La Pérouille (French pronunciation: [la peʁuj]) is a commune in the Indre department in central France.

== Geography ==
The commune is located in the parc naturel régional de la Brenne.

== Population ==
Historical population
Year	Pop.	±% p.a.
1968	362	—
1975	334	−1.14%
1982	354	+0.83%
1990	336	−0.65%
1999	334	−0.07%
2007	409	+2.56%
2012	449	+1.88%
2017	457	+0.35%
2023	427	−1.13%
Source: INSEE

== See also ==
- Communes of the Indre department
