= Chitray =

- Commune
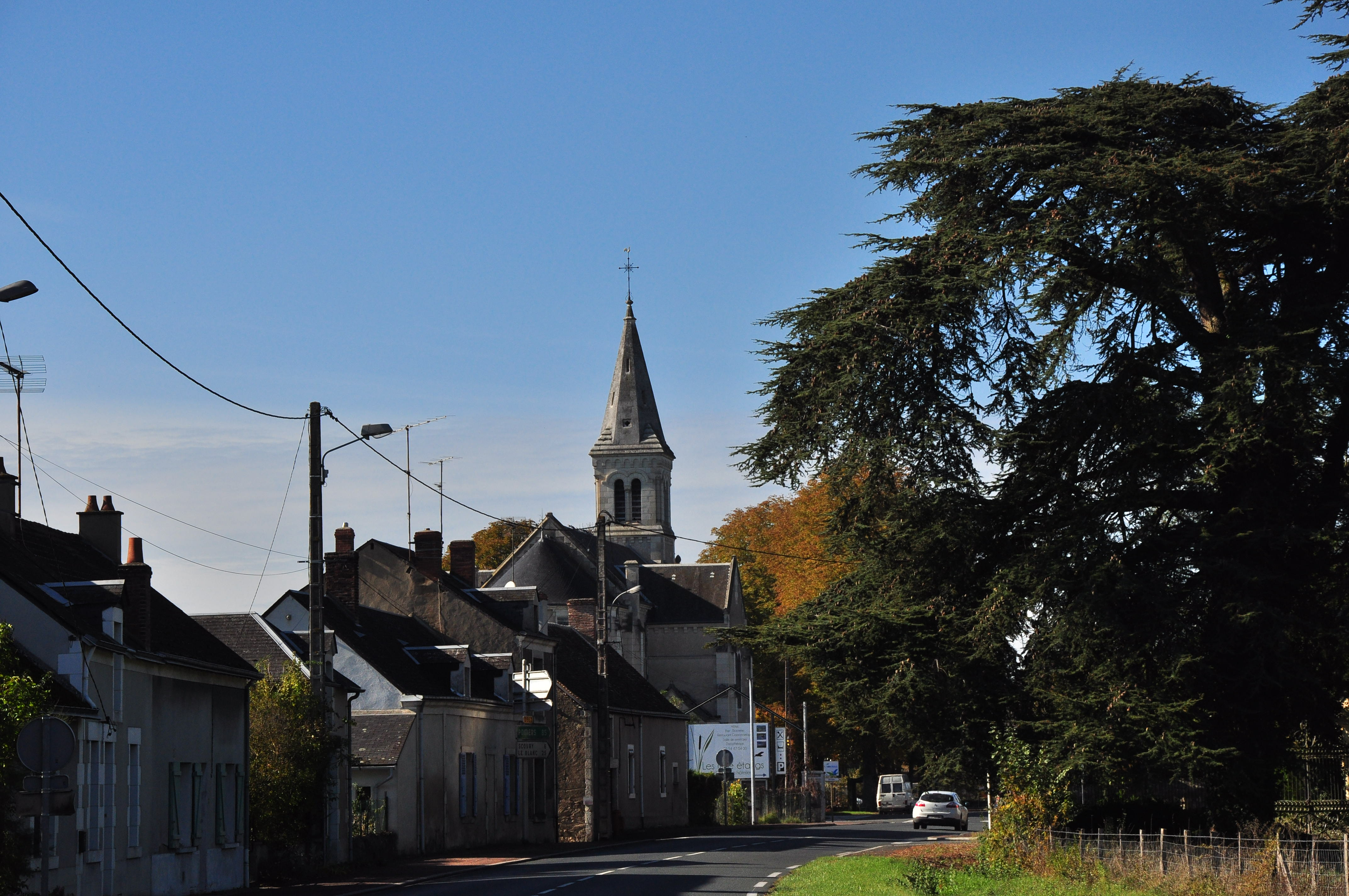
- The church and surroundings, in Chitray
- Location of Chitray
- Location within France Location within Centre-Val de Loire
- Coordinates: 46°38′11″N 1°21′35″E
- Country: France
- Region: Centre-Val de Loire
- Department: Indre
- Arrondissement: Le Blanc
- Canton: Saint-Gaultier

Government
  - Mayor (2020–2026): Catherine Lerat
- Area^{1}: 19.94 km^{2} (7.70 sq mi)
- Elevation: 98 m (322 ft)
- Highest elevation: 152 m (499 ft)
- Lowest elevation: 87 m (285 ft)
- Population (2023): 172
  - Density: 8.63/km^{2} (22.3/sq mi)
- Time zone: UTC+01:00 (CET)
  - Summer (DST): UTC+02:00 (CEST)
- INSEE/Postal code: 36051 /36800
- ^{1} French Land Register data, which excludes lakes, ponds, glaciers > 1 km^{2} (0.386 sq mi or 247 acres) and river estuaries.

Chitray (French pronunciation: [ʃitʁɛ]) is a commune in the Indre department in central France.

== Geography ==
The commune is located in the parc naturel régional de la Brenne.

== Population ==
Historical population
Year	Pop.	±% p.a.
1968	248	—
1975	222	−1.57%
1982	191	−2.13%
1990	167	−1.66%
1999	143	−1.71%
2007	161	+1.49%
2012	167	+0.73%
2017	182	+1.74%
2023	172	−0.94%
Source: INSEE

== See also ==
- Communes of the Indre department
