= Migné =

- Commune
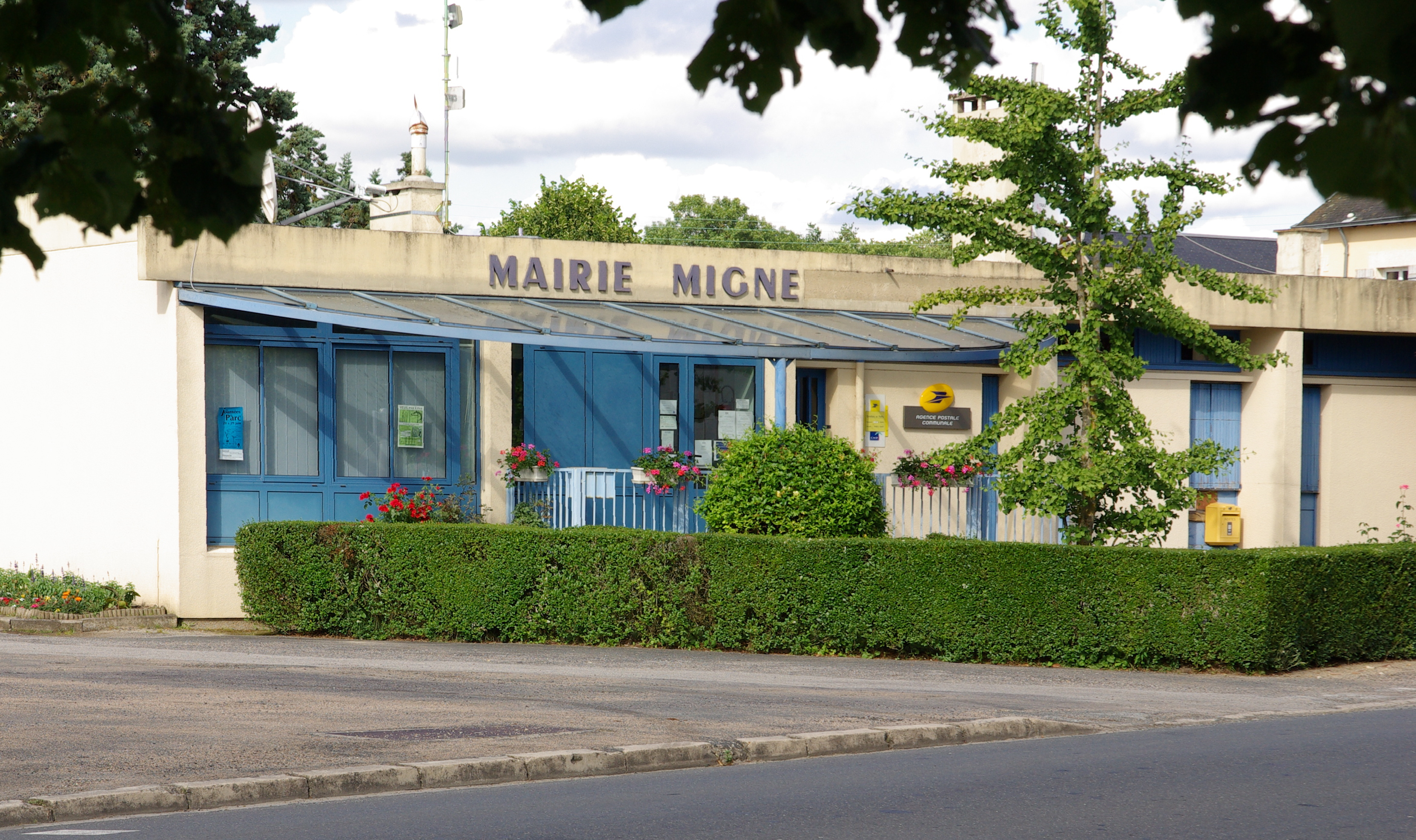
- The town hall in Migné
- Location of Migné
- Location within France Location within Centre-Val de Loire
- Coordinates: 46°43′03″N 1°19′04″E
- Country: France
- Region: Centre-Val de Loire
- Department: Indre
- Arrondissement: Le Blanc
- Canton: Saint-Gaultier
- Intercommunality: Cœur de Brenne

Government
  - Mayor (2020–2026): Pierre Tellier
- Area^{1}: 56.32 km^{2} (21.75 sq mi)
- Elevation: 108 m (354 ft)
- Highest elevation: 138 m (453 ft)
- Lowest elevation: 96 m (315 ft)
- Population (2023): 225
  - Density: 4.00/km^{2} (10.3/sq mi)
- Time zone: UTC+01:00 (CET)
  - Summer (DST): UTC+02:00 (CEST)
- INSEE/Postal code: 36124 /36800
- ^{1} French Land Register data, which excludes lakes, ponds, glaciers > 1 km^{2} (0.386 sq mi or 247 acres) and river estuaries.

Migné (French pronunciation: [miɲe]) is a commune in the Indre department in central France.

== Geography ==
The commune is located in the parc naturel régional de la Brenne.

== Population ==
Historical population
Year	Pop.	±% p.a.
1968	506	—
1975	407	−3.06%
1982	330	−2.95%
1990	321	−0.35%
1999	296	−0.90%
2007	275	−0.92%
2012	283	+0.58%
2017	275	−0.57%
2023	225	−3.29%
Source: INSEE

== See also ==
- Communes of the Indre department
