= Saint-Michel-en-Brenne =

- Commune
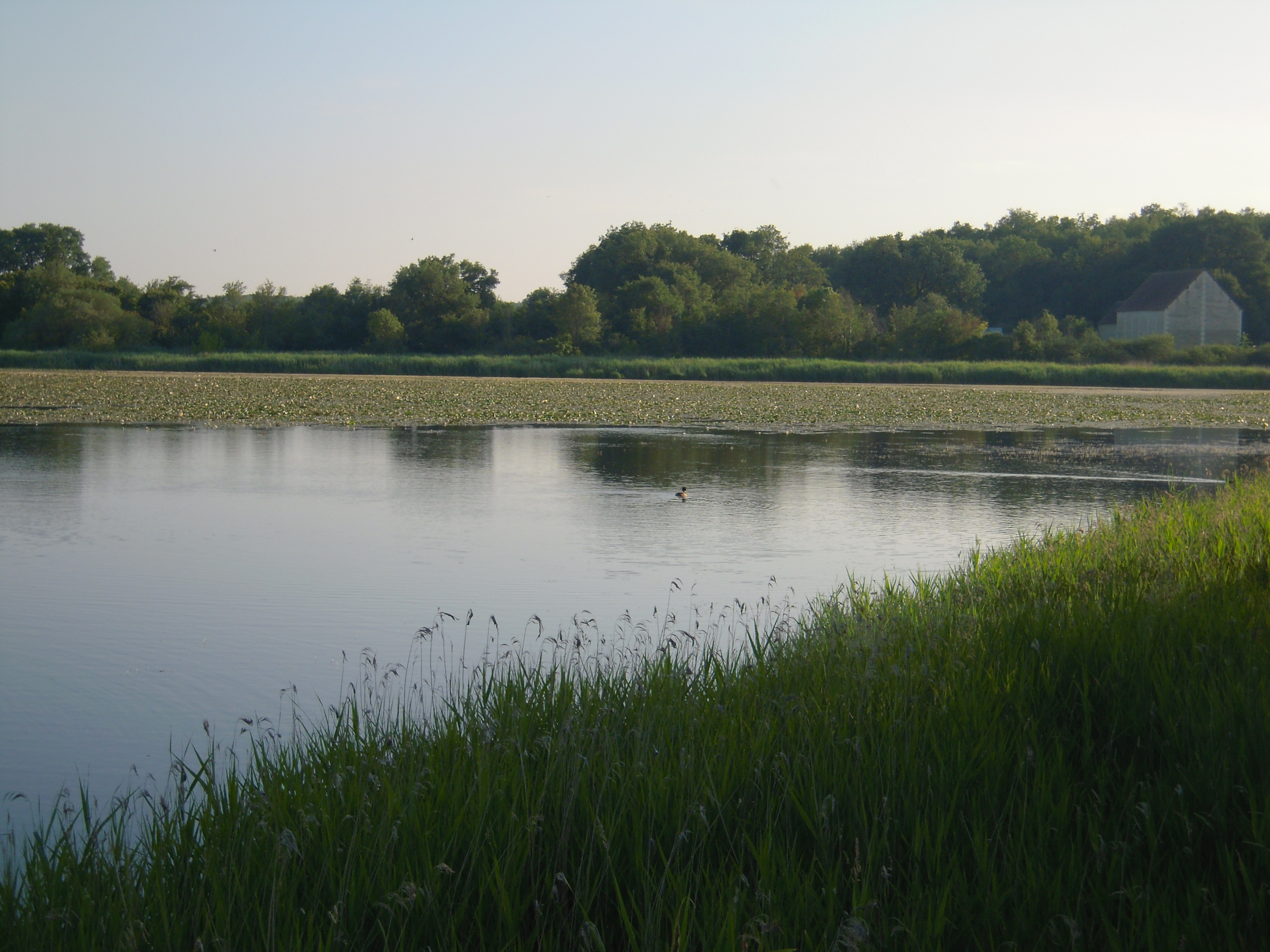
- A view beside the pond in Saint-Michel en Brenne
- Location of Saint-Michel-en-Brenne
- Location within France Location within Centre-Val de Loire
- Coordinates: 46°48′25″N 1°09′32″E
- Country: France
- Region: Centre-Val de Loire
- Department: Indre
- Arrondissement: Le Blanc
- Canton: Le Blanc
- Intercommunality: Cœur de Brenne

Government
  - Mayor (2020–2026): Guy Valet
- Area^{1}: 49.15 km^{2} (18.98 sq mi)
- Elevation: 85 m (279 ft)
- Highest elevation: 111 m (364 ft)
- Lowest elevation: 76 m (249 ft)
- Population (2023): 313
  - Density: 6.37/km^{2} (16.5/sq mi)
- Time zone: UTC+01:00 (CET)
  - Summer (DST): UTC+02:00 (CEST)
- INSEE/Postal code: 36204 /36290
- ^{1} French Land Register data, which excludes lakes, ponds, glaciers > 1 km^{2} (0.386 sq mi or 247 acres) and river estuaries.

Saint-Michel-en-Brenne (French pronunciation: [sɛ̃ miʃɛl ɑ̃ bʁɛn]) is a commune and town in the French department of Indre, administrative region of Centre-Val de Loire, France.

== Geography ==
The town is located in the parc naturel régional de la Brenne.

== Population ==
Historical population
Year	Pop.	±% p.a.
1968	449	—
1975	413	−1.19%
1982	401	−0.42%
1990	346	−1.83%
1999	308	−1.28%
2007	321	+0.52%
2012	323	+0.12%
2017	323	+0.00%
2023	313	−0.52%
Source: INSEE

== See also ==
- Communes of the Indre department
