= Parc naturel régional de la Brenne =

French regional nature park

Coordinates: 46°43′15″N 1°10′25″E

Designations

Ramsar Wetland
- Official name: La Brenne
- Designated: 8 April 1991
- Reference no.: 518

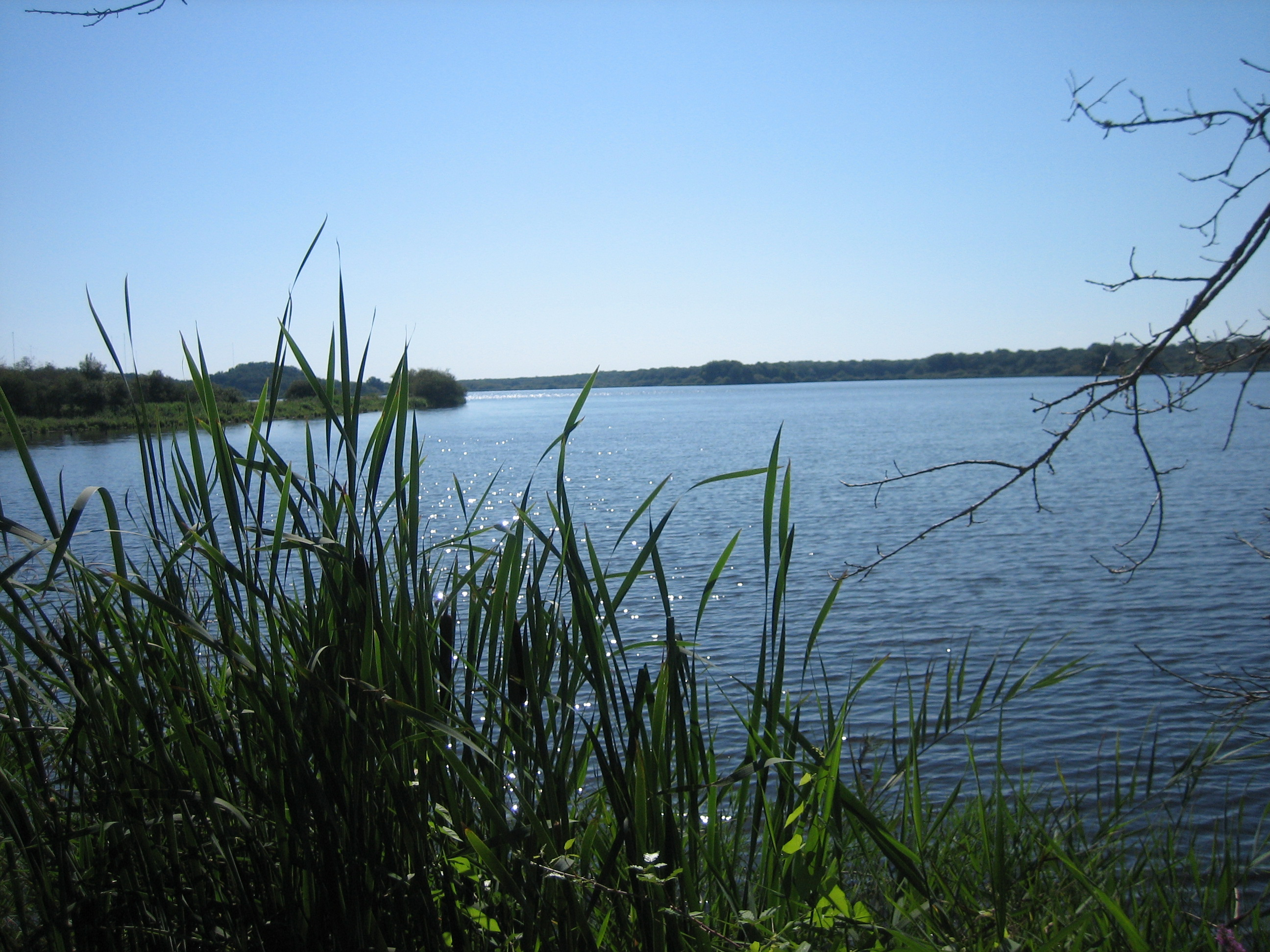
Etang Mer Rouge. Parc naturel régional de la Brenne.

The parc naturel régional de la Brenne (French pronunciation: [paʁk natyʁɛl ʁeʒjɔnal də la bʁɛn]; lit. 'Regional nature park of Brenne') is an 1,672 km^{2} (646 sq mi) large regional nature park located in the French department of Indre, France. It was founded December 22, 1982. Of old, La Brenne was a region in the old French provinces of Berry and Touraine, west of Châteauroux and east of Tournon-Saint-Martin. The park is cut in two by the river Creuse. Through the southern half flows the river Anglin. Historically, the southern part of the regional park is not really part of La Brenne. This part is called La petite Brenne. Historically, it was part of the Boischaut region.

Like in all French national and regional parks, there still are people living in the park. The park has 47 communes, of which the capital is Le Blanc.

== Communes of La Brenne ==
Obterre - Azay-le-Ferron - Paulnay - Saulnay - Lureuil - Néons-sur-Creuse - Tournon-Saint-Martin - Lurais - Preuilly-la-Ville - Pouligny-Saint-Pierre - Fontgombault - Sauzelles - Saint-Aigny - Le Blanc - Douadic - Mérigny - Ingrandes - Concremiers - Mauvières - Saint-Hilaire-sur-Benaize - Bélâbre - Chalais - Lignac - Tilly - Prissac - Sacierges-Saint-Martin - Chazelet - Luzeret - Thenay - Saint-Gaultier - Rivarennes - Chitray - Oulches - Ciron - Ruffec - Rosnay - Saint-Michel-en-Brenne - Mézières-en-Brenne - Sainte-Gemme - Vendœuvres - Migné - Méobecq - Nuret-le-Ferron - Neuillay-les-Bois - Luant - La Pérouille- Martizay
