= Thenay, Indre =

Thenay
- Commune
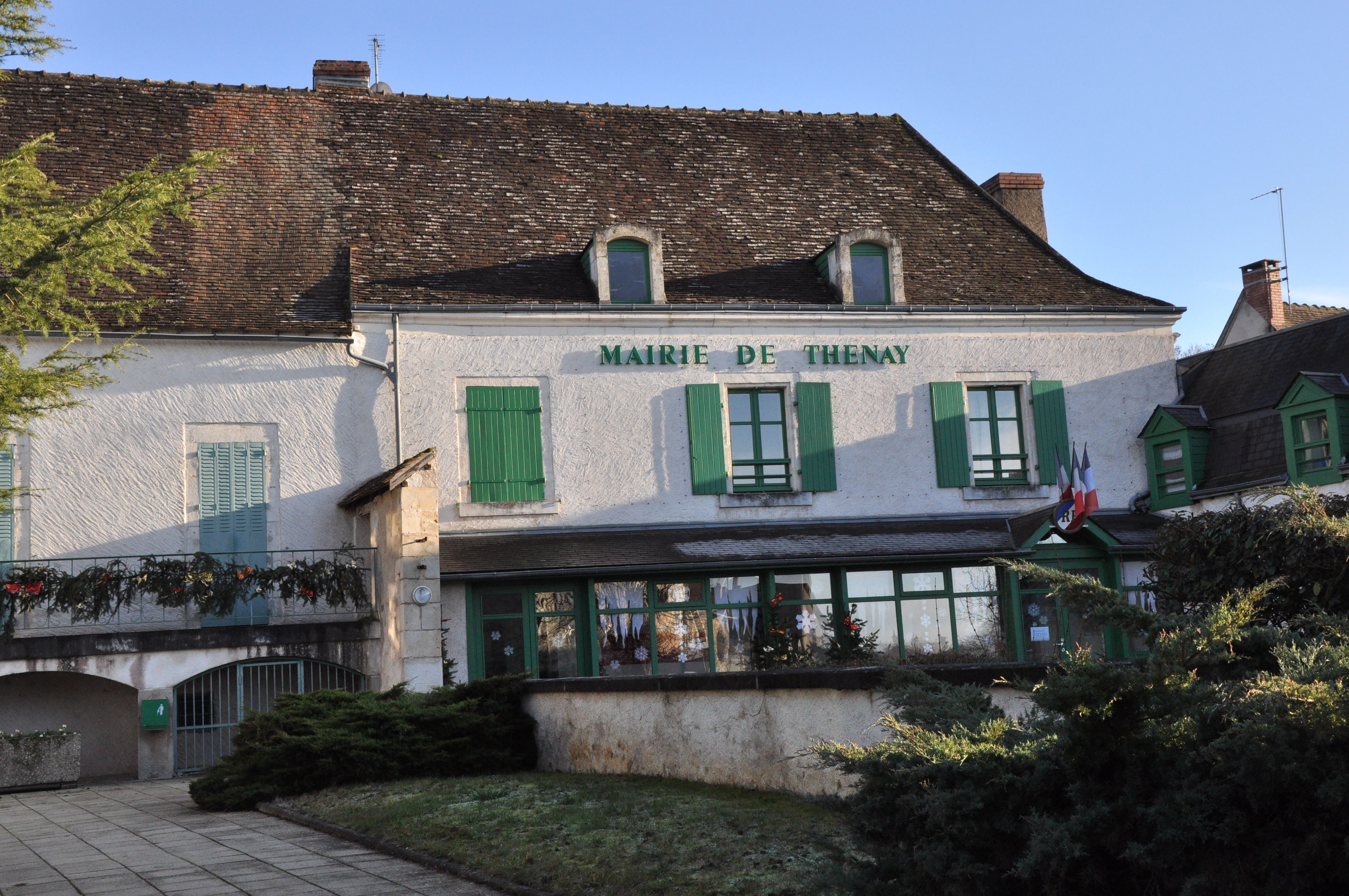
- Town hall
- Location of Thenay
- Location within France Location within Centre-Val de Loire
- Coordinates: 46°37′51″N 1°25′47″E
- Country: France
- Region: Centre-Val de Loire
- Department: Indre
- Arrondissement: Le Blanc
- Canton: Saint-Gaultier
- Intercommunality: Brenne Val de Creuse

Government
  - Mayor (2020–2026): Lydie Lacou
- Area^{1}: 34.21 km^{2} (13.21 sq mi)
- Elevation: 101 m (331 ft)
- Highest elevation: 187 m (614 ft)
- Lowest elevation: 93 m (305 ft)
- Population (2023): 893
  - Density: 26.1/km^{2} (67.6/sq mi)
- Time zone: UTC+01:00 (CET)
  - Summer (DST): UTC+02:00 (CEST)
- INSEE/Postal code: 36220 /36800
- ^{1} French Land Register data, which excludes lakes, ponds, glaciers > 1 km^{2} (0.386 sq mi or 247 acres) and river estuaries.

Thenay (French pronunciation: [tənɛ]) is a commune in the Indre department in central France.

== Geography ==
The commune is located in the parc naturel régional de la Brenne.

== Population ==
Historical population
Year	Pop.	±% p.a.
1968	890	—
1975	901	+0.18%
1982	826	−1.23%
1990	809	−0.26%
1999	827	+0.24%
2007	885	+0.85%
2012	888	+0.07%
2017	891	+0.07%
2023	893	+0.04%
Source: INSEE

== See also ==
- Communes of the Indre department
