= Luzeret =

- Commune
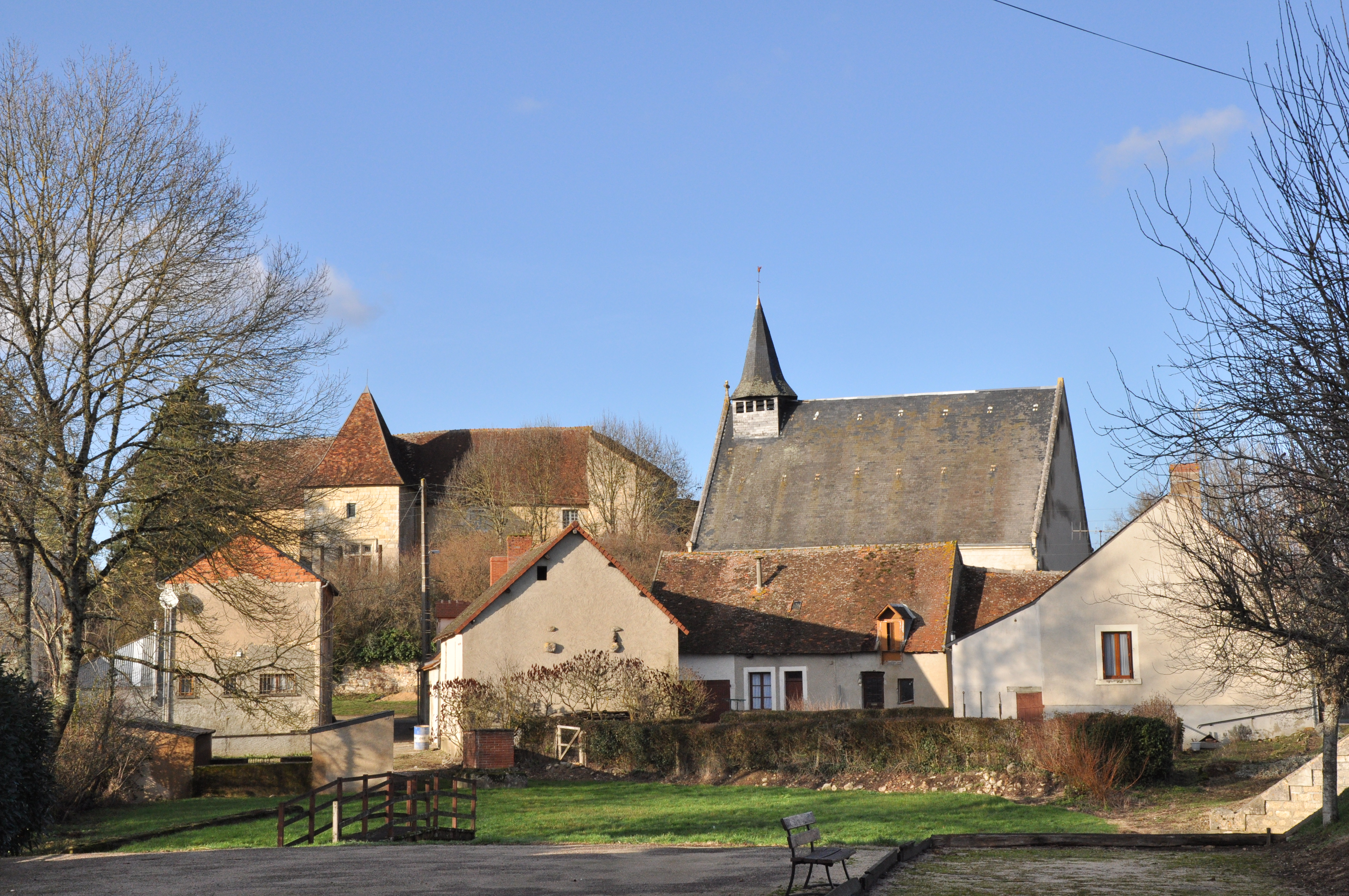
- The church and the château, in Luzeret
- Location of Luzeret
- Location within France Location within Centre-Val de Loire
- Coordinates: 46°32′33″N 1°23′35″E
- Country: France
- Region: Centre-Val de Loire
- Department: Indre
- Arrondissement: Le Blanc
- Canton: Saint-Gaultier
- Intercommunality: Brenne Val de Creuse

Government
  - Mayor (2020–2026): Didier Rollet
- Area^{1}: 26.78 km^{2} (10.34 sq mi)
- Elevation: 155 m (509 ft)
- Highest elevation: 192 m (630 ft)
- Lowest elevation: 128 m (420 ft)
- Population (2023): 155
  - Density: 5.79/km^{2} (15.0/sq mi)
- Time zone: UTC+01:00 (CET)
  - Summer (DST): UTC+02:00 (CEST)
- INSEE/Postal code: 36106 /36800
- ^{1} French Land Register data, which excludes lakes, ponds, glaciers > 1 km^{2} (0.386 sq mi or 247 acres) and river estuaries.

Luzeret (French pronunciation: [lyzʁɛ]) is a commune in the Indre department in central France.

== Geography ==
The commune is located in the parc naturel régional de la Brenne.

== Population ==
Historical population
Year	Pop.	±% p.a.
1968	306	—
1975	250	−2.85%
1982	214	−2.20%
1990	161	−3.49%
1999	160	−0.07%
2007	152	−0.64%
2012	144	−1.08%
2017	153	+1.22%
2023	155	+0.22%
Source: INSEE

== See also ==
- Communes of the Indre department
