= Saulnay =

- Commune
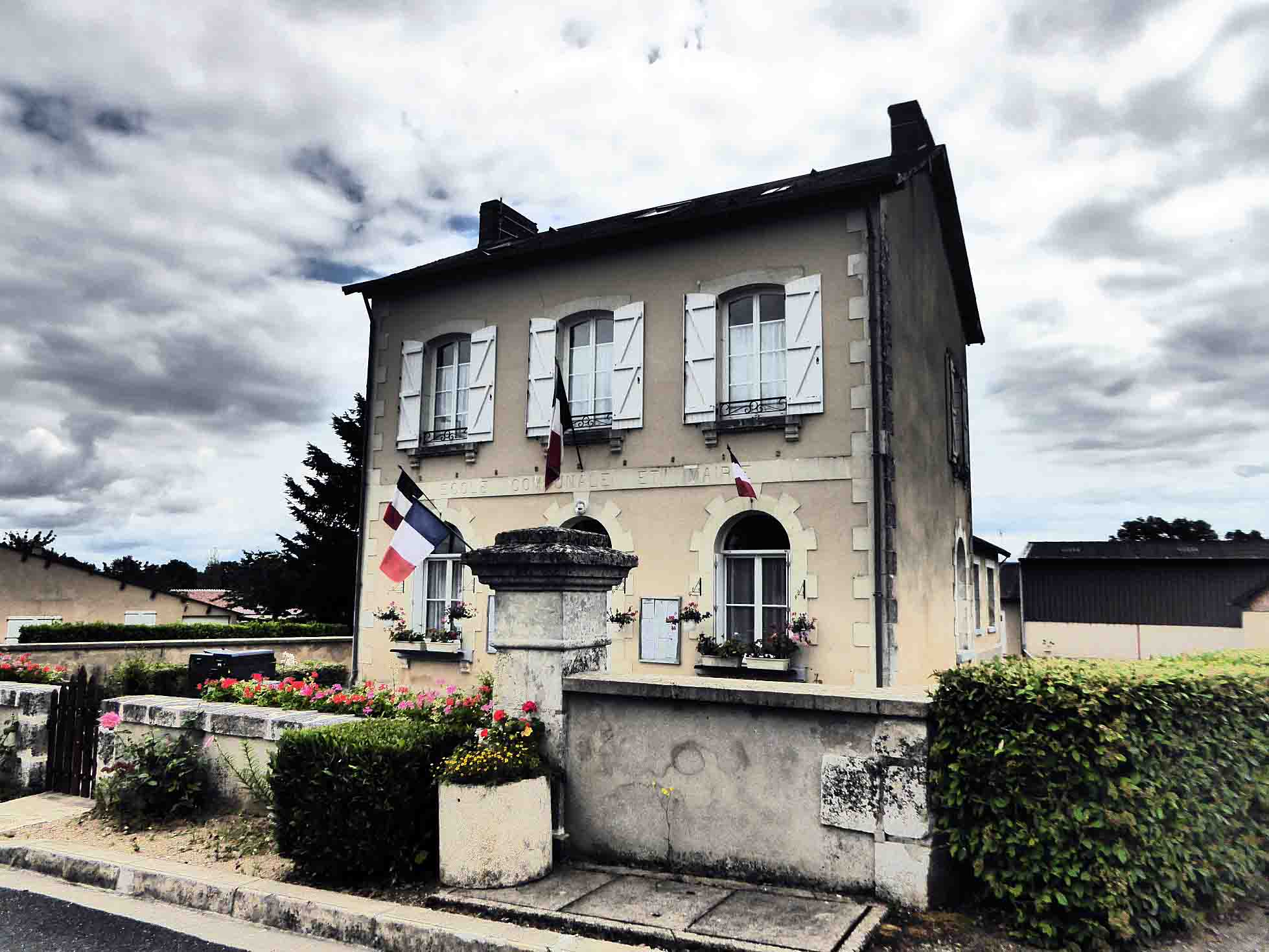
- Town hall
- Location of Saulnay
- Location within France Location within Centre-Val de Loire
- Coordinates: 46°52′10″N 1°16′11″E
- Country: France
- Region: Centre-Val de Loire
- Department: Indre
- Arrondissement: Le Blanc
- Canton: Le Blanc
- Intercommunality: Cœur de Brenne

Government
  - Mayor (2020–2026): Christian Boislaigue
- Area^{1}: 22.2 km^{2} (8.6 sq mi)
- Elevation: 130 m (430 ft)
- Highest elevation: 146 m (479 ft)
- Lowest elevation: 97 m (318 ft)
- Population (2023): 164
  - Density: 7.39/km^{2} (19.1/sq mi)
- Demonym(s): Saulnaisien, Saulnaisienne
- Time zone: UTC+01:00 (CET)
  - Summer (DST): UTC+02:00 (CEST)
- INSEE/Postal code: 36212 /36290
- ^{1} French Land Register data, which excludes lakes, ponds, glaciers > 1 km^{2} (0.386 sq mi or 247 acres) and river estuaries.

Saulnay (French pronunciation: [so(l)nɛ]) is a commune and town in the French department of Indre, Centre-Val de Loire.

== Geography ==
The commune is located in the parc naturel régional de la Brenne.

== Population ==
Historical population
Year	Pop.	±% p.a.
1968	346	—
1975	270	−3.48%
1982	212	−3.40%
1990	210	−0.12%
1999	179	−1.76%
2007	182	+0.21%
2012	185	+0.33%
2017	157	−3.23%
2023	164	+0.73%
Source: INSEE

== See also ==
- Communes of the Indre department
