= Saint-Aigny =

- Commune
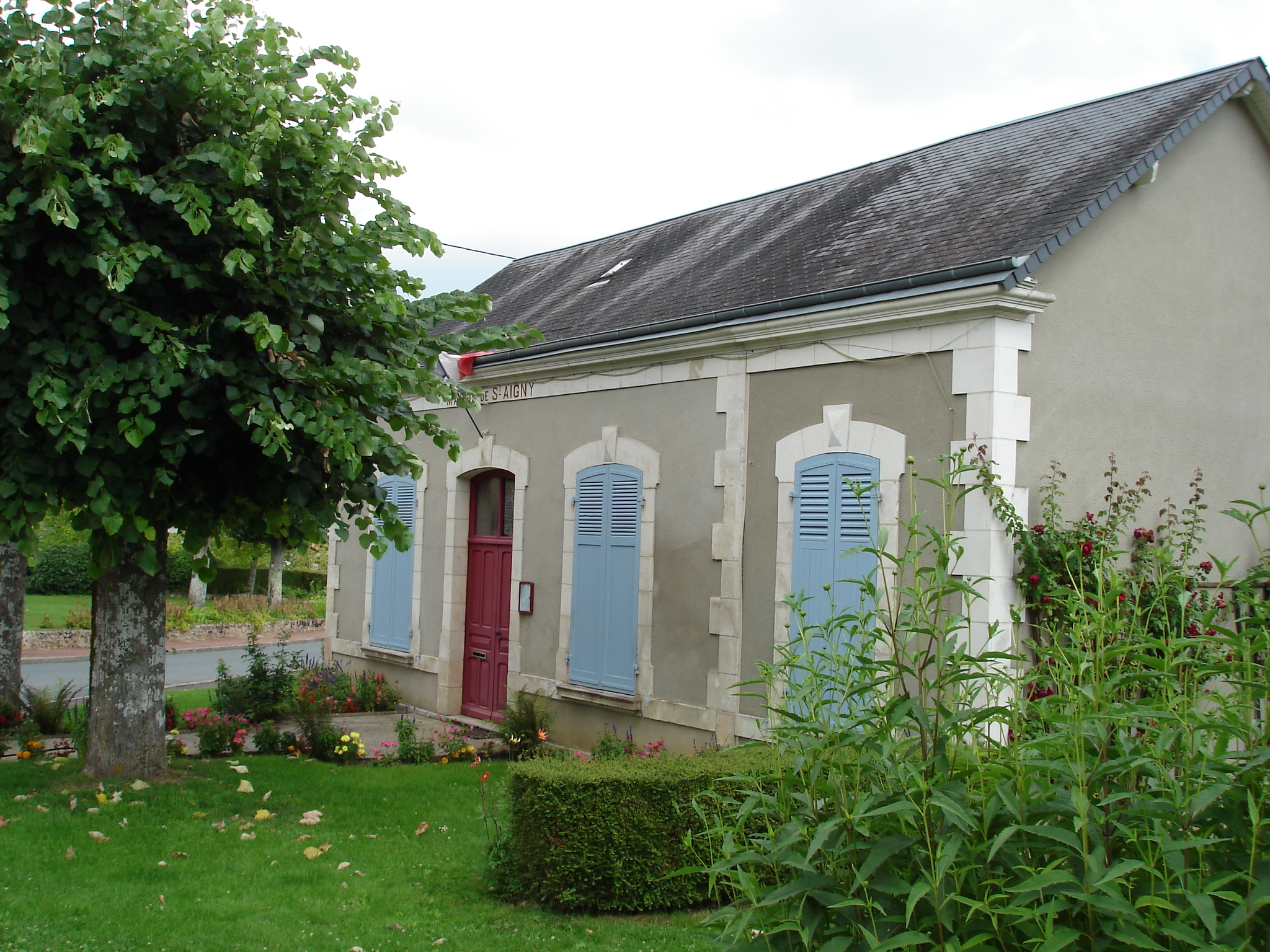
- The town hall in Saint-Aigny
- Location of Saint-Aigny
- Location within France Location within Centre-Val de Loire
- Coordinates: 46°38′48″N 1°01′34″E
- Country: France
- Region: Centre-Val de Loire
- Department: Indre
- Arrondissement: Le Blanc
- Canton: Le Blanc

Government
  - Mayor (2020–2026): Jean-Louis Chezeaux
- Area^{1}: 14.86 km^{2} (5.74 sq mi)
- Elevation: 90 m (300 ft)
- Highest elevation: 141 m (463 ft)
- Lowest elevation: 72 m (236 ft)
- Population (2023): 276
  - Density: 18.6/km^{2} (48.1/sq mi)
- Time zone: UTC+01:00 (CET)
  - Summer (DST): UTC+02:00 (CEST)
- INSEE/Postal code: 36178 /36300
- ^{1} French Land Register data, which excludes lakes, ponds, glaciers > 1 km^{2} (0.386 sq mi or 247 acres) and river estuaries.

Saint-Aigny (French pronunciation: [sɛ̃.t‿ɛɲi]) is a commune in the Indre department in central France.

== Geography ==
The commune is located in the parc naturel régional de la Brenne.

== Population ==
Historical population
Year	Pop.	±% p.a.
1968	254	—
1975	223	−1.84%
1982	235	+0.75%
1990	244	+0.47%
1999	256	+0.53%
2007	292	+1.66%
2012	298	+0.41%
2017	282	−1.10%
2023	276	−0.36%
Source: INSEE

== See also ==
- Communes of the Indre department
