= Mézières-en-Brenne =

- Commune
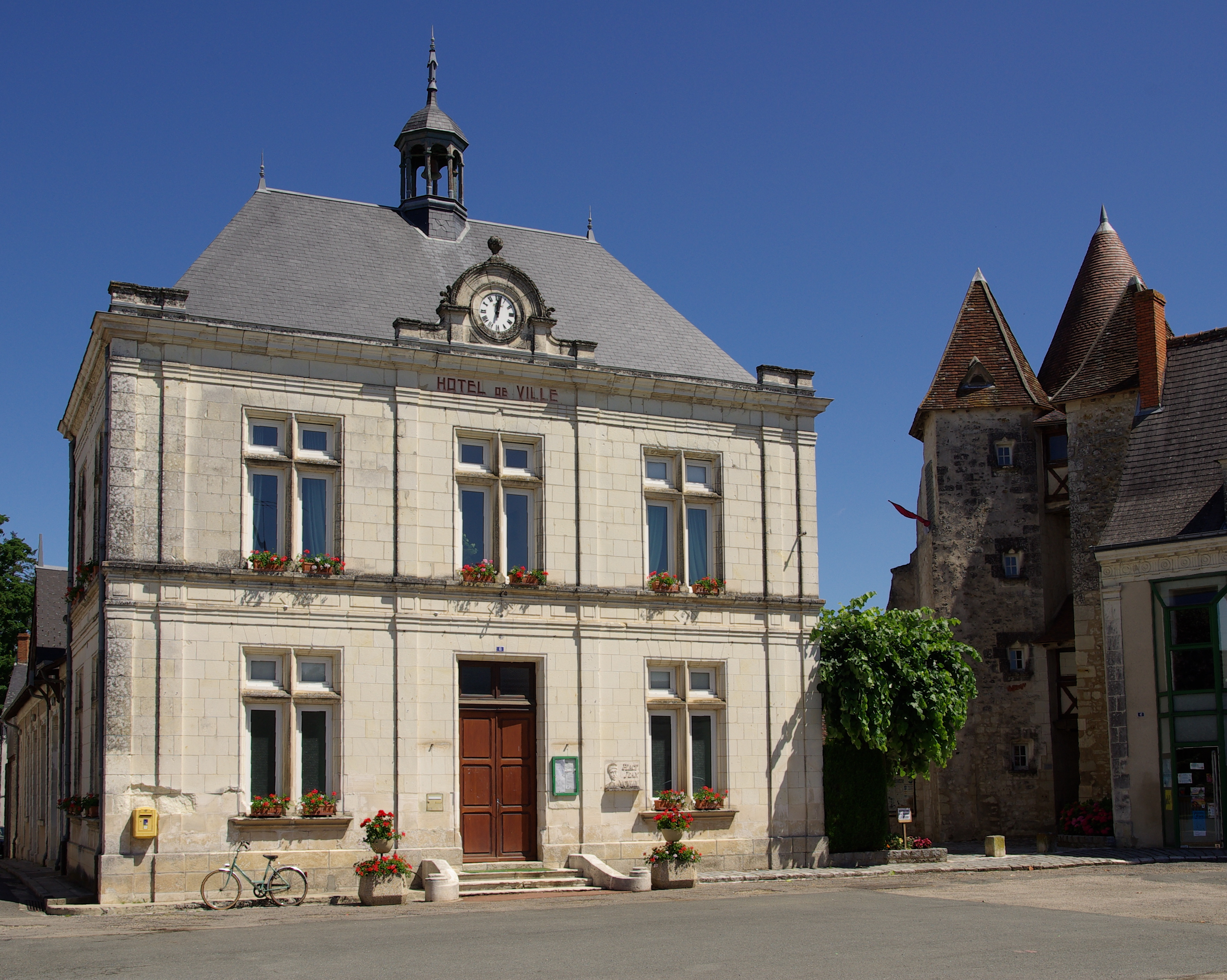
- The town hall in Mézières-en-Brenne

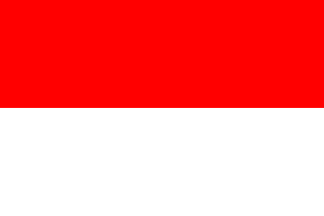
- Flag Coat of arms
- Location of Mézières-en-Brenne
- Location within France Location within Centre-Val de Loire
- Coordinates: 46°49′18″N 1°12′41″E
- Country: France
- Region: Centre-Val de Loire
- Department: Indre
- Arrondissement: Le Blanc
- Canton: Le Blanc

Government
  - Mayor (2020–2026): Jean-Louis Camus
- Area^{1}: 57.57 km^{2} (22.23 sq mi)
- Elevation: 90 m (300 ft)
- Highest elevation: 138 m (453 ft)
- Lowest elevation: 84 m (276 ft)
- Population (2023): 941
  - Density: 16.3/km^{2} (42.3/sq mi)
- Time zone: UTC+01:00 (CET)
  - Summer (DST): UTC+02:00 (CEST)
- INSEE/Postal code: 36123 /36290
- ^{1} French Land Register data, which excludes lakes, ponds, glaciers > 1 km^{2} (0.386 sq mi or 247 acres) and river estuaries.

Mézières-en-Brenne (French pronunciation: [mezjɛːʁ ɑ̃ bʁɛn]) is a commune in the Indre department in central France.

== Natural park ==
It is located is at the heart of the Brenne regional natural park. The Brenne is one of France's most important wetlands. A large diversity of habitats has meant that the commune is home to an abundance of wildlife, of which the best known are the birds: purple heron, black-necked grebe, bittern, marsh harrier, whiskered tern, short-toed eagle. The Brenne is also Europe's most important site for the European pond tortoise.

== Population ==
Historical population
Year	Pop.	±% p.a.
1968	1,232	—
1975	1,168	−0.76%
1982	1,186	+0.22%
1990	1,194	+0.08%
1999	1,160	−0.32%
2007	1,081	−0.88%
2012	1,075	−0.11%
2017	1,001	−1.42%
2023	941	−1.02%
Source: INSEE

== See also ==
- Communes of the Indre department
