= Douadic =

- Commune
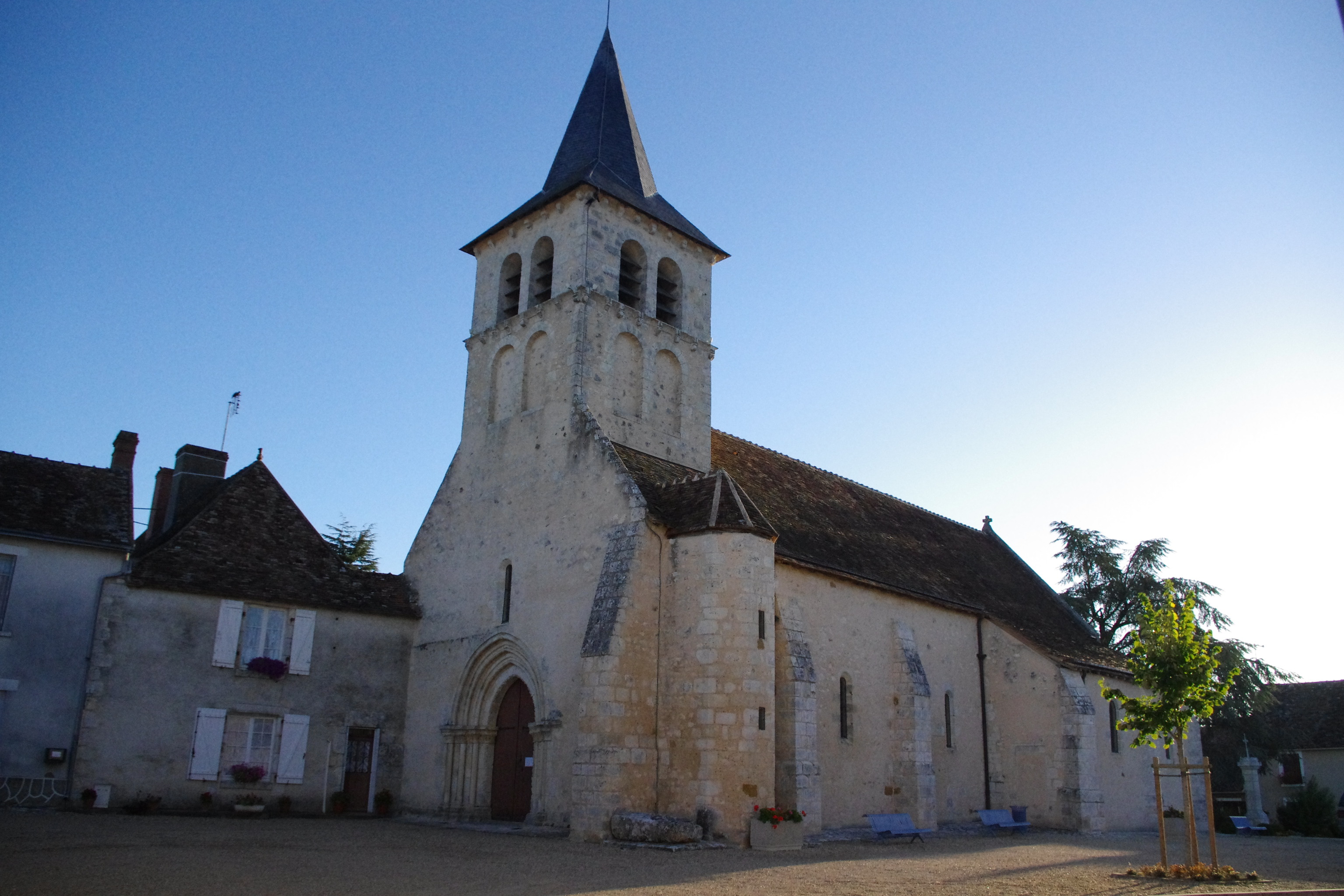
- The Church of Saint-Ambroix, in Douadic

- Coat of arms
- Location of Douadic
- Location within France Location within Centre-Val de Loire
- Coordinates: 46°42′21″N 1°06′44″E
- Country: France
- Region: Centre-Val de Loire
- Department: Indre
- Arrondissement: Le Blanc
- Canton: Le Blanc
- Intercommunality: Brenne Val de Creuse

Government
  - Mayor (2020–2026): Christel Bondoux
- Area^{1}: 43.14 km^{2} (16.66 sq mi)
- Elevation: 93 m (305 ft)
- Highest elevation: 150 m (490 ft)
- Lowest elevation: 87 m (285 ft)
- Population (2023): 478
  - Density: 11.1/km^{2} (28.7/sq mi)
- Time zone: UTC+01:00 (CET)
  - Summer (DST): UTC+02:00 (CEST)
- INSEE/Postal code: 36066 /36300
- ^{1} French Land Register data, which excludes lakes, ponds, glaciers > 1 km^{2} (0.386 sq mi or 247 acres) and river estuaries.

Douadic (French pronunciation: [dwadik]) is a commune in the Indre department in central France.

== Geography ==
The commune is located in the parc naturel régional de la Brenne.

== Population ==
Historical population
Year	Pop.	±% p.a.
1968	675	—
1975	566	−2.48%
1982	518	−1.26%
1990	486	−0.79%
1999	440	−1.10%
2007	427	−0.37%
2012	479	+2.32%
2017	445	−1.46%
2023	478	+1.20%
Source: INSEE

== See also ==
- Communes of the Indre department
