= Nuret-le-Ferron =

- Commune
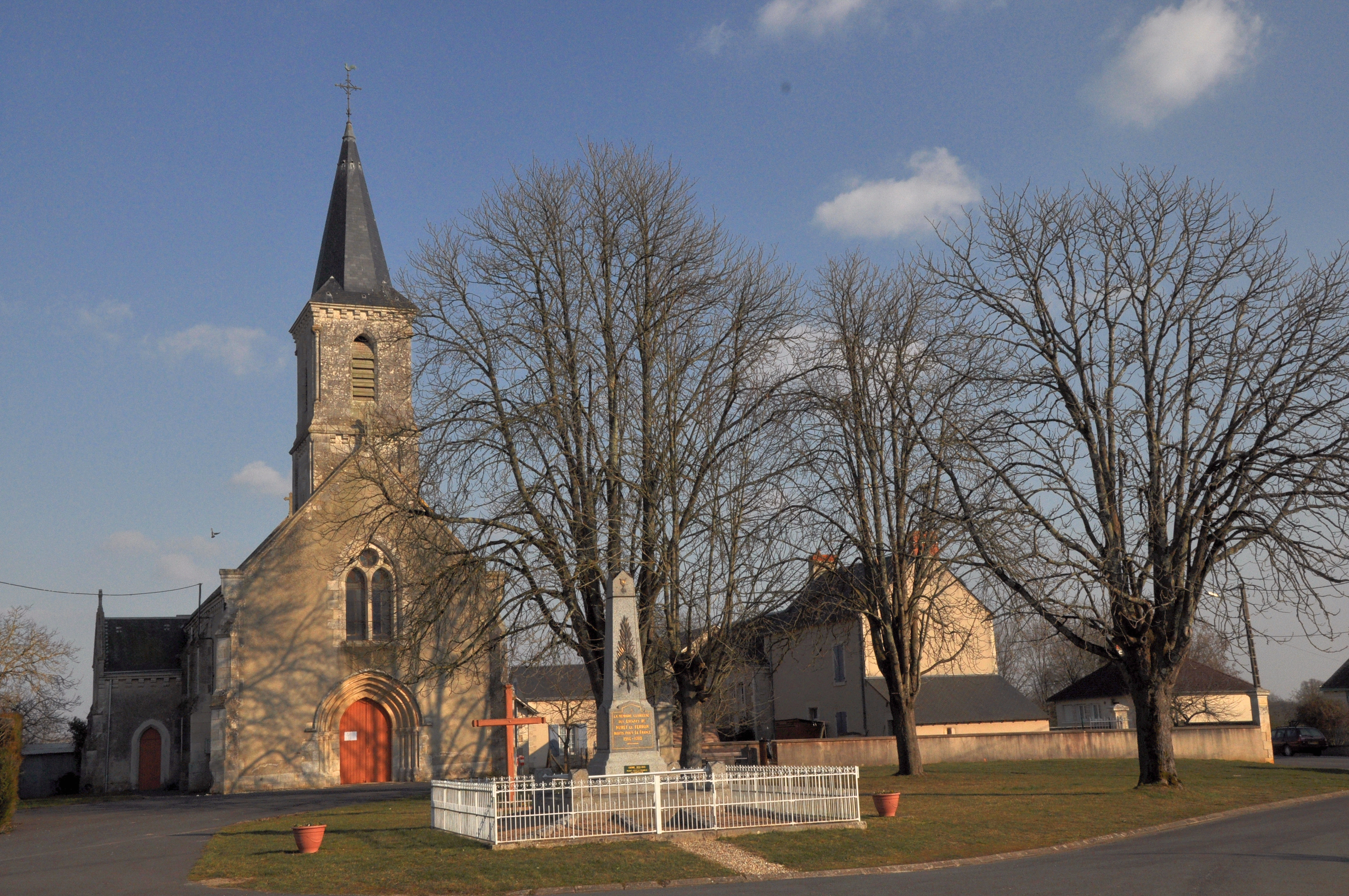
- The church in Nuret-le-Ferron
- Location of Nuret-le-Ferron
- Location within France Location within Centre-Val de Loire
- Coordinates: 46°41′06″N 1°26′02″E
- Country: France
- Region: Centre-Val de Loire
- Department: Indre
- Arrondissement: Le Blanc
- Canton: Saint-Gaultier
- Intercommunality: Brenne Val de Creuse

Government
  - Mayor (2020–2026): Hervé Jeunesse
- Area^{1}: 47.29 km^{2} (18.26 sq mi)
- Elevation: 152 m (499 ft)
- Highest elevation: 176 m (577 ft)
- Lowest elevation: 108 m (354 ft)
- Population (2023): 294
  - Density: 6.22/km^{2} (16.1/sq mi)
- Time zone: UTC+01:00 (CET)
  - Summer (DST): UTC+02:00 (CEST)
- INSEE/Postal code: 36144 /36800
- ^{1} French Land Register data, which excludes lakes, ponds, glaciers > 1 km^{2} (0.386 sq mi or 247 acres) and river estuaries.

Nuret-le-Ferron (French pronunciation: [nyʁɛ lə fɛʁɔ̃]) is a commune in the Indre department in central France.

== Geography ==
The commune is located in the parc naturel régional de la Brenne.

== Population ==
Historical population
Year	Pop.	±% p.a.
1968	411	—
1975	376	−1.26%
1982	319	−2.32%
1990	308	−0.44%
1999	315	+0.25%
2007	321	+0.24%
2012	310	−0.69%
2017	305	−0.32%
2023	294	−0.61%
Source: INSEE

== See also ==
- Communes of the Indre department
