= Villiers, Indre =

Villiers
- Commune
- Location of Villiers
- Location within France Location within Centre-Val de Loire
- Coordinates: 46°53′17″N 1°11′09″E
- Country: France
- Region: Centre-Val de Loire
- Department: Indre
- Arrondissement: Le Blanc
- Canton: Le Blanc
- Intercommunality: Cœur de Brenne

Government
  - Mayor (2020–2026): Christian Borgeais
- Area^{1}: 24.53 km^{2} (9.47 sq mi)
- Elevation: 144 m (472 ft)
- Highest elevation: 152 m (499 ft)
- Lowest elevation: 99 m (325 ft)
- Population (2023): 177
  - Density: 7.22/km^{2} (18.7/sq mi)
- Time zone: UTC+01:00 (CET)
  - Summer (DST): UTC+02:00 (CEST)
- INSEE/Postal code: 36246 /36290
- ^{1} French Land Register data, which excludes lakes, ponds, glaciers > 1 km^{2} (0.386 sq mi or 247 acres) and river estuaries.

Villiers (French pronunciation: [vilje]) is a commune in the Indre department in central France.

== Population ==
Historical population
Year	Pop.	±% p.a.
1968	353	—
1975	276	−3.45%
1982	230	−2.57%
1990	177	−3.22%
1999	189	+0.73%
2007	194	+0.33%
2012	202	+0.81%
2017	170	−3.39%
2023	177	+0.67%
Source: INSEE

== See also ==
- Communes of the Indre department
