= Oulches =

- Commune
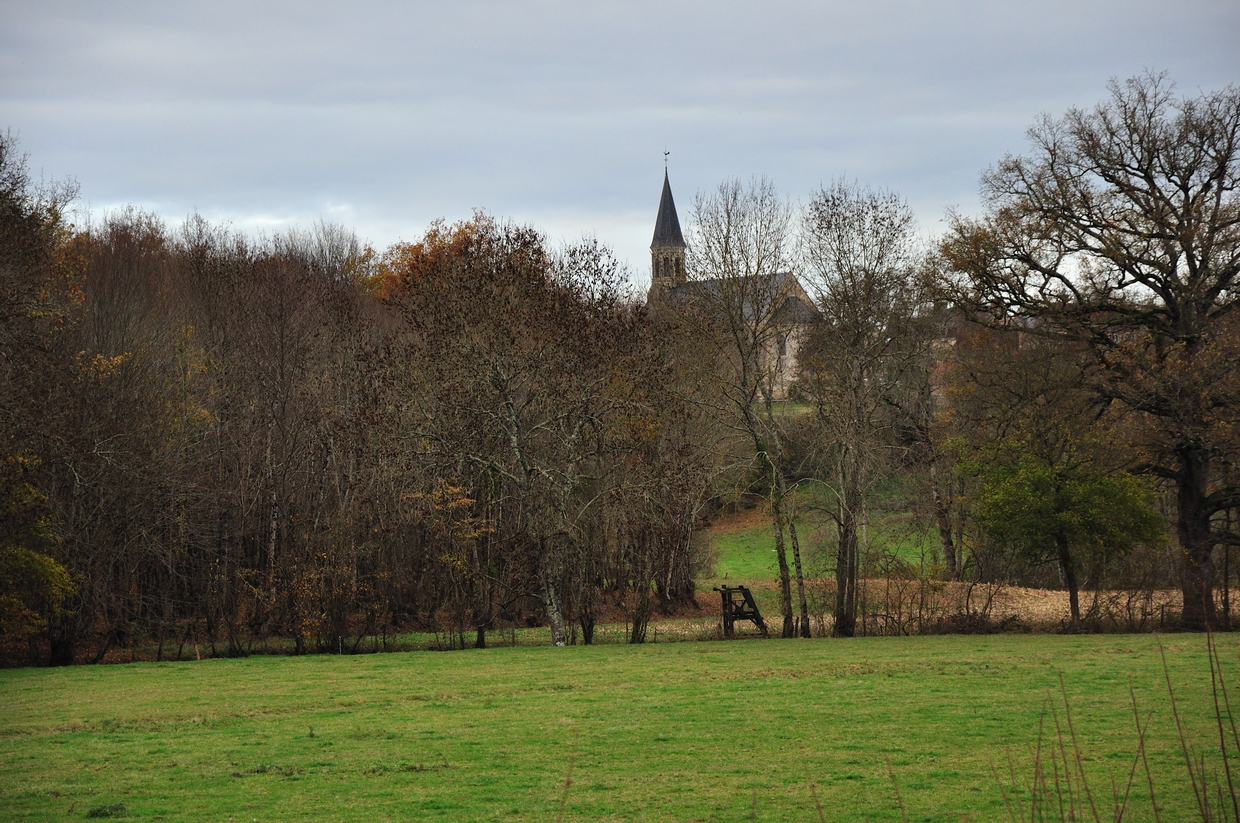
- The church in the distance
- Location of Oulches
- Location within France Location within Centre-Val de Loire
- Coordinates: 46°36′58″N 1°17′53″E
- Country: France
- Region: Centre-Val de Loire
- Department: Indre
- Arrondissement: Le Blanc
- Canton: Saint-Gaultier
- Intercommunality: Brenne Val de Creuse

Government
  - Mayor (2020–2026): Claude Mériot
- Area^{1}: 43.36 km^{2} (16.74 sq mi)
- Elevation: 125 m (410 ft)
- Highest elevation: 163 m (535 ft)
- Lowest elevation: 84 m (276 ft)
- Population (2023): 424
  - Density: 9.78/km^{2} (25.3/sq mi)
- Time zone: UTC+01:00 (CET)
  - Summer (DST): UTC+02:00 (CEST)
- INSEE/Postal code: 36148 /36800
- ^{1} French Land Register data, which excludes lakes, ponds, glaciers > 1 km^{2} (0.386 sq mi or 247 acres) and river estuaries.

Oulches (French pronunciation: [ulʃ]) is a commune in the Indre department in central France.

== Geography ==
The commune is located in the parc naturel régional de la Brenne.

== Population ==
Historical population
Year	Pop.	±% p.a.
1968	676	—
1975	589	−1.95%
1982	566	−0.57%
1990	528	−0.86%
1999	374	−3.76%
2007	407	+1.06%
2012	411	+0.20%
2017	409	−0.10%
2023	424	+0.60%
Source: INSEE

== See also ==
- Communes of the Indre department
