= Concremiers =

- Commune
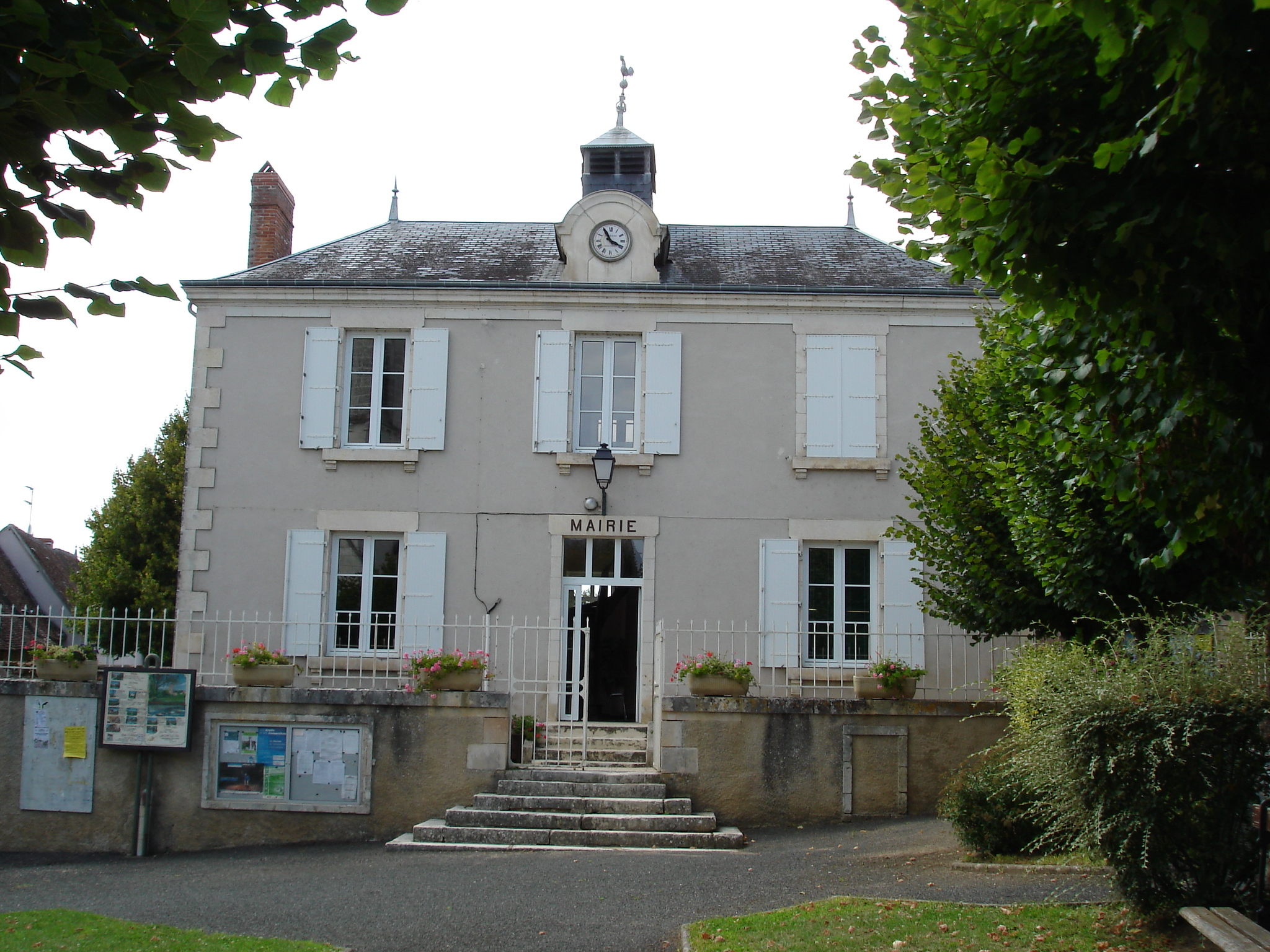
- The town hall in Concremiers
- Location of Concremiers
- Location within France Location within Centre-Val de Loire
- Coordinates: 46°35′52″N 1°01′03″E
- Country: France
- Region: Centre-Val de Loire
- Department: Indre
- Arrondissement: Le Blanc
- Canton: Le Blanc
- Intercommunality: Brenne Val de Creuse

Government
  - Mayor (2020–2026): Daniel Dejollat
- Area^{1}: 28.11 km^{2} (10.85 sq mi)
- Elevation: 75 m (246 ft)
- Highest elevation: 131 m (430 ft)
- Lowest elevation: 77 m (253 ft)
- Population (2023): 590
  - Density: 21/km^{2} (54/sq mi)
- Time zone: UTC+01:00 (CET)
  - Summer (DST): UTC+02:00 (CEST)
- INSEE/Postal code: 36058 /36300
- ^{1} French Land Register data, which excludes lakes, ponds, glaciers > 1 km^{2} (0.386 sq mi or 247 acres) and river estuaries.

Concremiers (French pronunciation: [kɔ̃kʁəmje]) is a commune in the Indre department in central France.

== Geography ==
The commune is located in the parc naturel régional de la Brenne.

The Salleron forms part of the commune's western border, then flows into the Anglin. The village lies in the middle of the commune, on the right bank of the Anglin, which flows west through the commune.

== Population ==
Historical population
Year	Pop.	±% p.a.
1968	646	—
1975	601	−1.03%
1982	608	+0.17%
1990	629	+0.43%
1999	610	−0.34%
2007	631	+0.42%
2012	653	+0.69%
2017	649	−0.12%
2023	590	−1.58%
Source: INSEE

== See also ==
- Communes of the Indre department
