= Sainte-Gemme, Indre =

Sainte-Gemme
- Commune
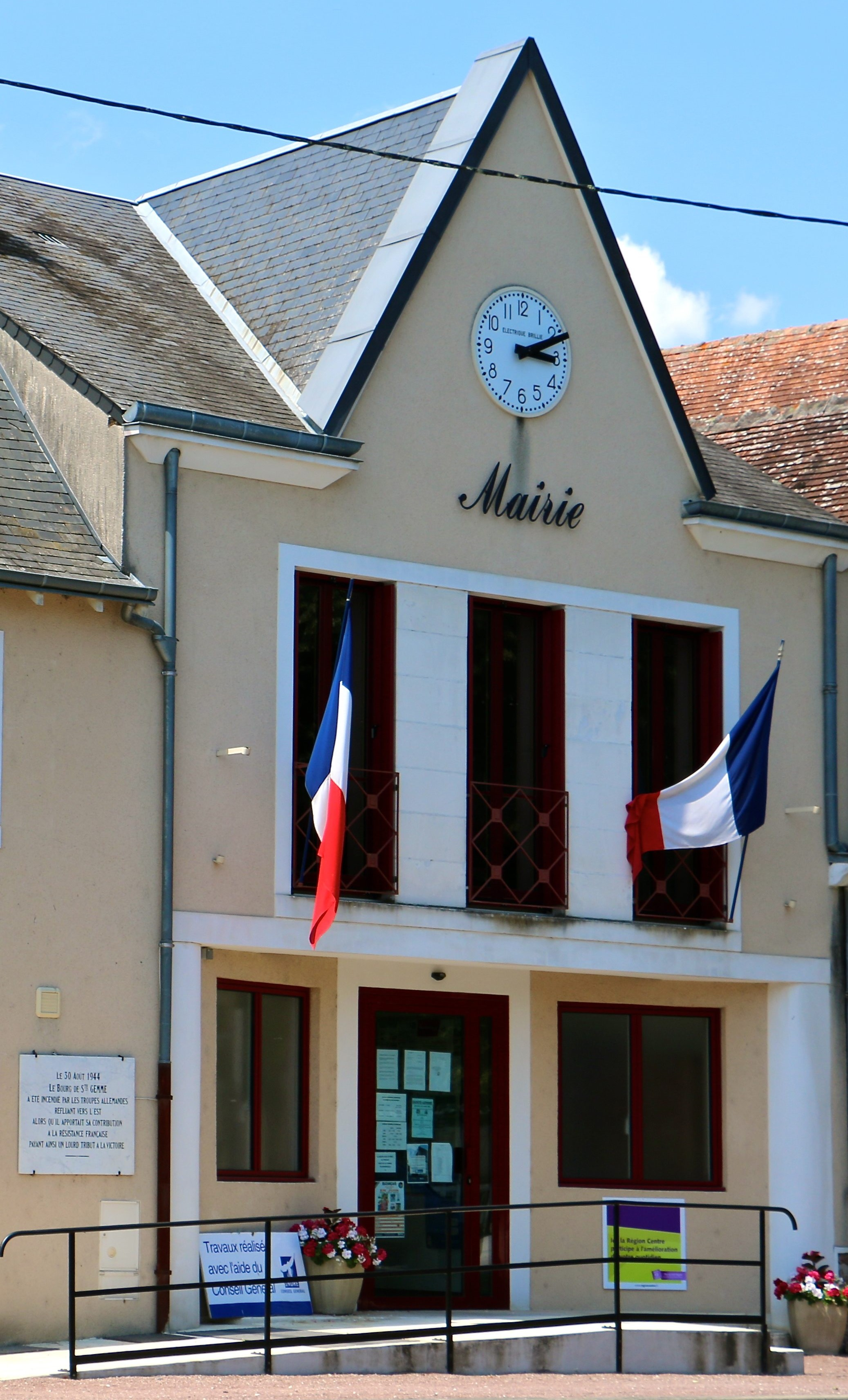
- Sainte-Gemme Town hall
- Location of Sainte-Gemme
- Location within France Location within Centre-Val de Loire
- Coordinates: 46°51′11″N 1°20′24″E
- Country: France
- Region: Centre-Val de Loire
- Department: Indre
- Arrondissement: Le Blanc
- Canton: Le Blanc
- Intercommunality: Cœur de Brenne

Government
  - Mayor (2020–2026): Jean-Louis Marcq
- Area^{1}: 32.5 km^{2} (12.5 sq mi)
- Elevation: 85 m (279 ft)
- Highest elevation: 138 m (453 ft)
- Lowest elevation: 94 m (308 ft)
- Population (2023): 262
  - Density: 8.06/km^{2} (20.9/sq mi)
- Time zone: UTC+01:00 (CET)
  - Summer (DST): UTC+02:00 (CEST)
- INSEE/Postal code: 36193 /36500
- ^{1} French Land Register data, which excludes lakes, ponds, glaciers > 1 km^{2} (0.386 sq mi or 247 acres) and river estuaries.

Sainte-Gemme (French pronunciation: [sɛ̃t ʒɛm]) is a commune in the Indre department in central France.

== Geography ==
The commune is located in the parc naturel régional de la Brenne.

== Population ==
Historical population
Year	Pop.	±% p.a.
1968	362	—
1975	294	−2.93%
1982	267	−1.37%
1990	284	+0.77%
1999	273	−0.44%
2007	265	−0.37%
2012	263	−0.15%
2017	262	−0.08%
2023	262	+0.00%
Source: INSEE

== See also ==
- Communes of the Indre department
