= Ruffec, Indre =

Ruffec
- Commune
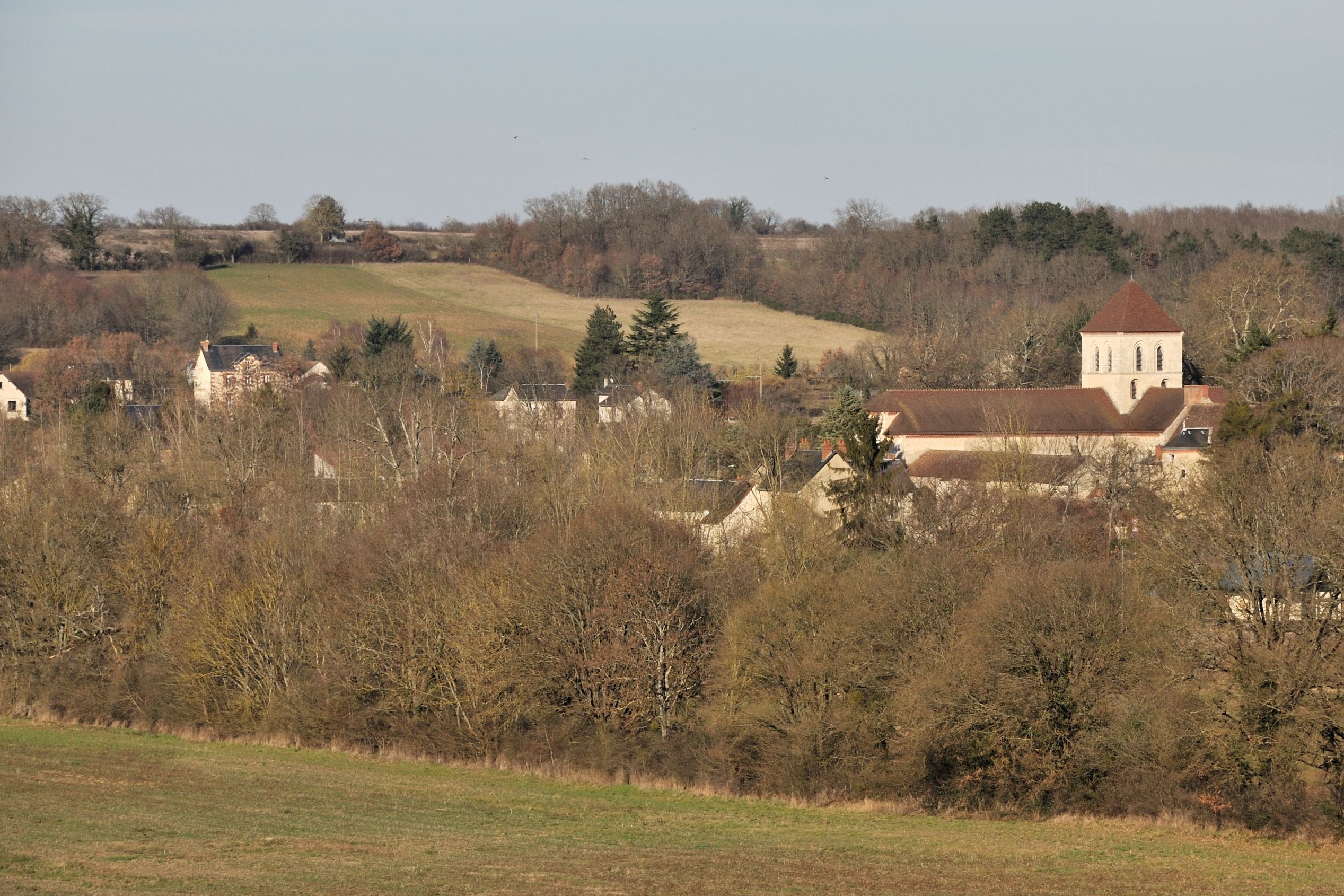
- A general view of Ruffec
- Location of Ruffec
- Location within France Location within Centre-Val de Loire
- Coordinates: 46°37′48″N 1°10′20″E
- Country: France
- Region: Centre-Val de Loire
- Department: Indre
- Arrondissement: Le Blanc
- Canton: Le Blanc
- Intercommunality: Brenne Val de Creuse

Government
  - Mayor (2020–2026): Édith Vachaud
- Area^{1}: 40.93 km^{2} (15.80 sq mi)
- Elevation: 87 m (285 ft)
- Highest elevation: 141 m (463 ft)
- Lowest elevation: 77 m (253 ft)
- Population (2023): 562
  - Density: 13.7/km^{2} (35.6/sq mi)
- Time zone: UTC+01:00 (CET)
  - Summer (DST): UTC+02:00 (CEST)
- INSEE/Postal code: 36176 /36300
- ^{1} French Land Register data, which excludes lakes, ponds, glaciers > 1 km^{2} (0.386 sq mi or 247 acres) and river estuaries.

Ruffec (French pronunciation: [ʁyfɛk]) is a commune in the Indre department in central France.

== Geography ==
The commune is located in the parc naturel régional de la Brenne.

== Population ==
Historical population
Year	Pop.	±% p.a.
1968	635	—
1975	607	−0.64%
1982	519	−2.21%
1990	594	+1.70%
1999	525	−1.36%
2007	635	+2.41%
2012	619	−0.51%
2017	589	−0.99%
2023	562	−0.78%
Source: INSEE

== See also ==
- Communes of the Indre department
