= Preuilly-la-Ville =

- Commune
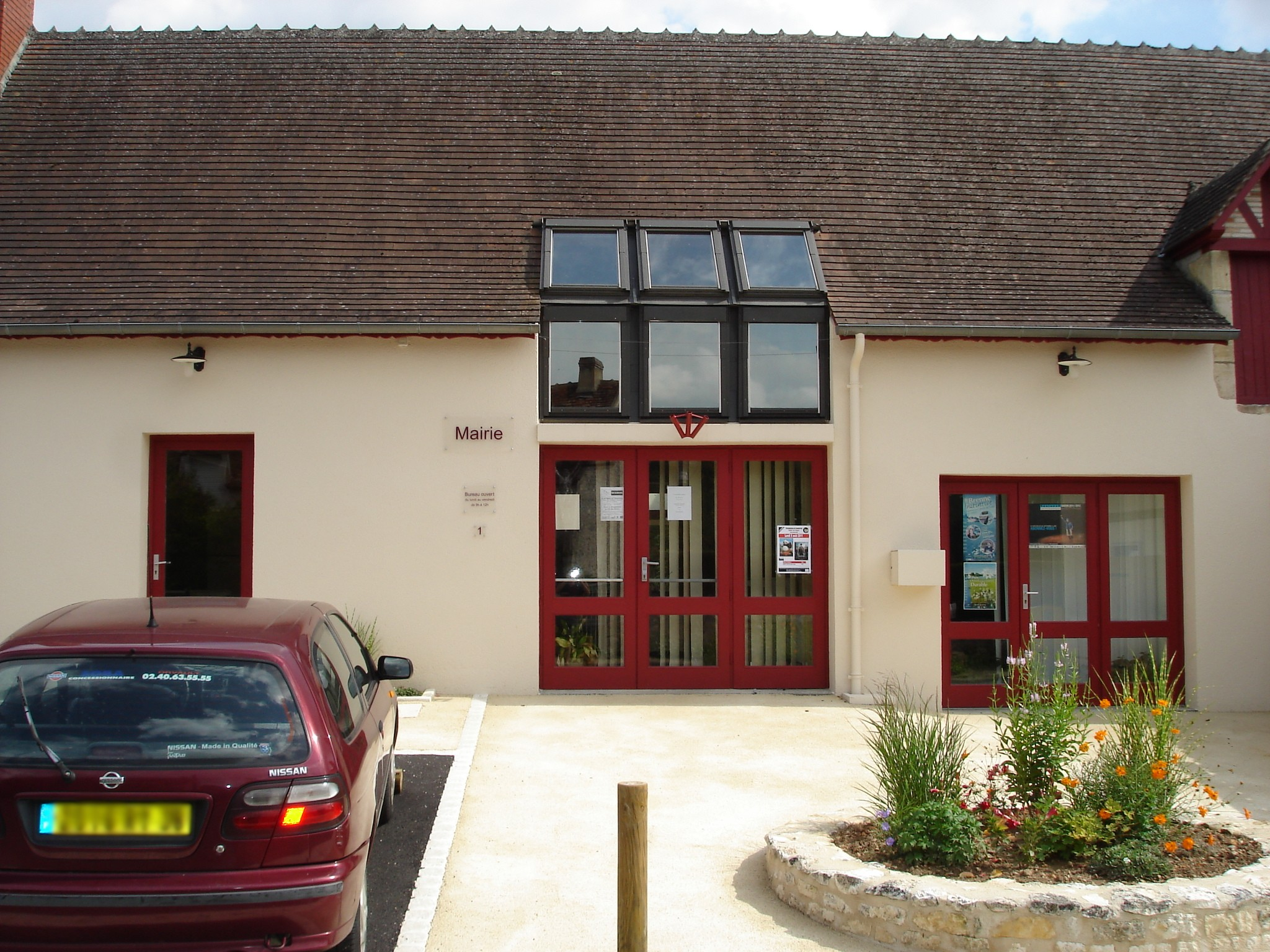
- Town hall
- Location of Preuilly-la-Ville
- Location within France Location within Centre-Val de Loire
- Coordinates: 46°41′51″N 0°58′08″E
- Country: France
- Region: Centre-Val de Loire
- Department: Indre
- Arrondissement: Le Blanc
- Canton: Le Blanc

Government
  - Mayor (2020–2026): Alain Marie Rembaut
- Area^{1}: 4.23 km^{2} (1.63 sq mi)
- Elevation: 107 m (351 ft)
- Highest elevation: 117 m (384 ft)
- Lowest elevation: 67 m (220 ft)
- Population (2023): 150
  - Density: 35/km^{2} (92/sq mi)
- Time zone: UTC+01:00 (CET)
  - Summer (DST): UTC+02:00 (CEST)
- INSEE/Postal code: 36167 /36220
- ^{1} French Land Register data, which excludes lakes, ponds, glaciers > 1 km^{2} (0.386 sq mi or 247 acres) and river estuaries.

Preuilly-la-Ville (French pronunciation: [pʁœji la vil]) is a commune in the Indre department in central France.

== Geography ==
The commune is located in the parc naturel régional de la Brenne.

== Population ==
Historical population
Year	Pop.	±% p.a.
1968	183	—
1975	156	−2.25%
1982	160	+0.36%
1990	148	−0.97%
1999	131	−1.35%
2007	165	+2.93%
2012	170	+0.60%
2017	162	−0.96%
2023	150	−1.27%
Source: INSEE

== See also ==
- Communes of the Indre department
