= Lureuil =

- Commune
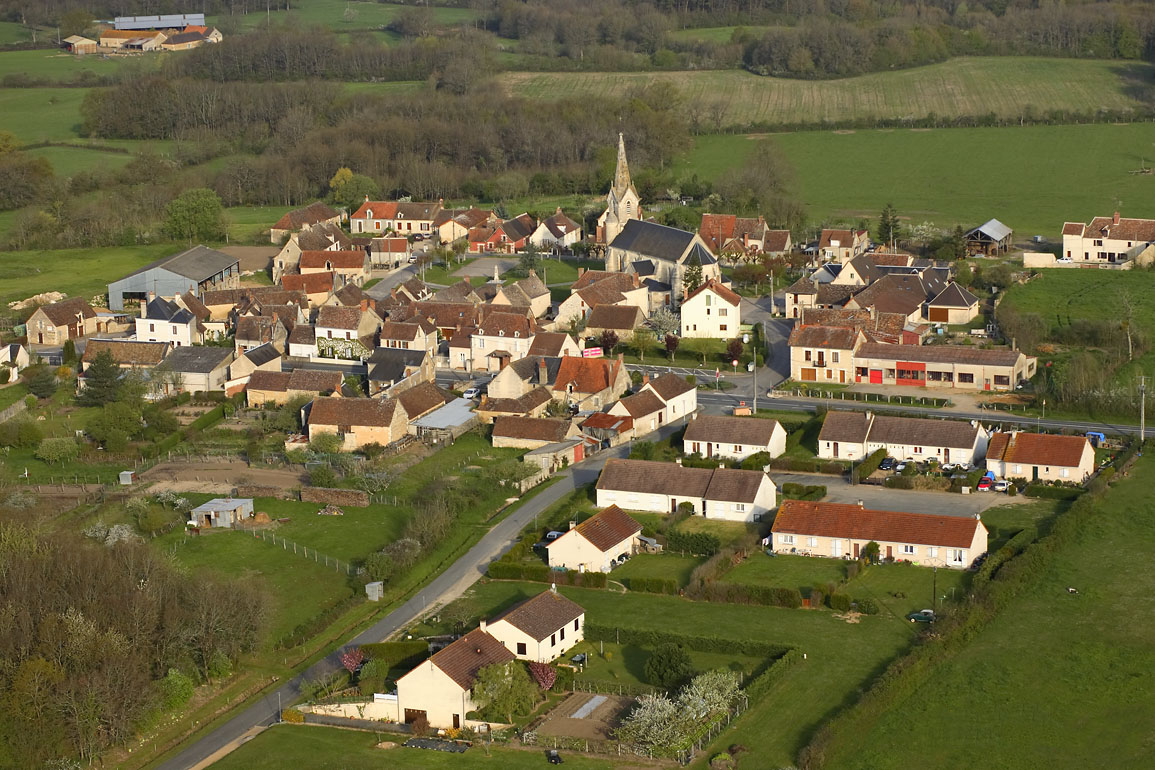
- The church and surrounding buildings in Lureuil
- Location of Lureuil
- Location within France Location within Centre-Val de Loire
- Coordinates: 46°44′41″N 1°02′36″E
- Country: France
- Region: Centre-Val de Loire
- Department: Indre
- Arrondissement: Le Blanc
- Canton: Le Blanc

Government
  - Mayor (2020–2026): Jean-Louis Multon
- Area^{1}: 22.04 km^{2} (8.51 sq mi)
- Elevation: 152 m (499 ft)
- Highest elevation: 151 m (495 ft)
- Lowest elevation: 90 m (300 ft)
- Population (2023): 274
  - Density: 12.4/km^{2} (32.2/sq mi)
- Time zone: UTC+01:00 (CET)
  - Summer (DST): UTC+02:00 (CEST)
- INSEE/Postal code: 36105 /36220
- ^{1} French Land Register data, which excludes lakes, ponds, glaciers > 1 km^{2} (0.386 sq mi or 247 acres) and river estuaries.

Lureuil (French pronunciation: [lyʁœj]) is a commune in the Indre department in central France.

== Geography ==
The commune is located in the parc naturel régional de la Brenne.

== Population ==
Historical population
Year	Pop.	±% p.a.
1968	302	—
1975	222	−4.30%
1982	215	−0.46%
1990	281	+3.40%
1999	287	+0.24%
2007	275	−0.53%
2012	270	−0.37%
2017	263	−0.52%
2023	274	+0.69%
Source: INSEE

== See also ==
- Communes of the Indre department
