= Martizay =

- Commune
- Location of Martizay
- Location within France Location within Centre-Val de Loire
- Coordinates: 46°48′29″N 1°02′38″E
- Country: France
- Region: Centre-Val de Loire
- Department: Indre
- Arrondissement: Le Blanc
- Canton: Le Blanc
- Intercommunality: Cœur de Brenne

Government
  - Mayor (2020–2026): Hervé Fleury
- Area^{1}: 39 km^{2} (15 sq mi)
- Elevation: 84 m (276 ft)
- Highest elevation: 136 m (446 ft)
- Lowest elevation: 75 m (246 ft)
- Population (2023): 956
  - Density: 25/km^{2} (63/sq mi)
- Time zone: UTC+01:00 (CET)
  - Summer (DST): UTC+02:00 (CEST)
- INSEE/Postal code: 36113 /36220
- ^{1} French Land Register data, which excludes lakes, ponds, glaciers > 1 km^{2} (0.386 sq mi or 247 acres) and river estuaries.

Martizay (French pronunciation: [maʁtizɛ]) is a commune in the Indre department in central France. It is around 65 km (40 mi) south of Tours.

== Geography ==
The commune is located in the parc naturel régional de la Brenne.

== Population ==
Historical population
| Year | Pop. | ±% p.a. |
|---|---|---|
| 1968 | 1,312 | — |
| 1975 | 1,201 | −1.25% |
| 1982 | 1,163 | −0.46% |
| 1990 | 1,124 | −0.43% |
| 1999 | 1,049 | −0.76% |
| 2007 | 1,042 | −0.08% |
| 2012 | 1,010 | −0.62% |
| 2017 | 952 | −1.18% |
| 2023 | 956 | +0.07% |
Source: INSEE

== See also ==
- Communes of the Indre department
