= Tournon-Saint-Martin =

- Commune
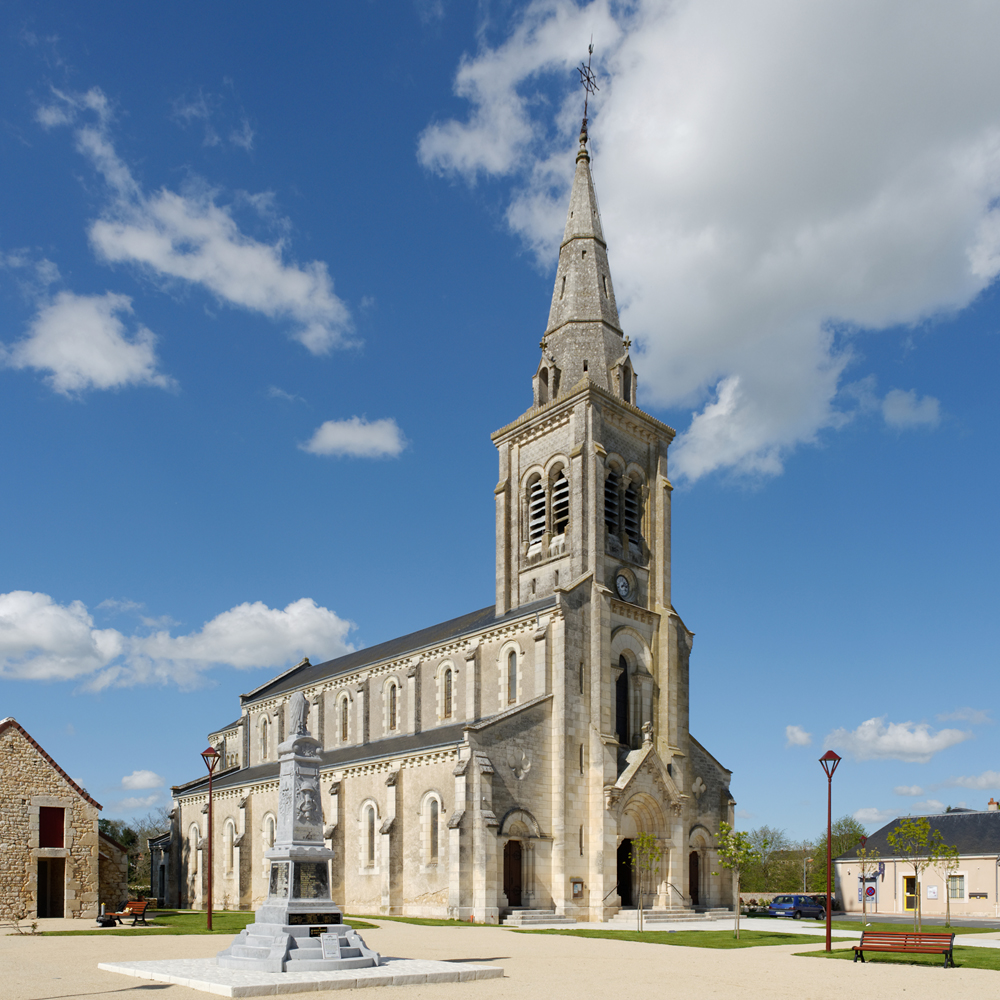
- The church of Saint-Martin, in Tournon-Saint-Martin

- Coat of arms
- Location of Tournon-Saint-Martin
- Location within France Location within Centre-Val de Loire
- Coordinates: 46°44′07″N 0°57′18″E
- Country: France
- Region: Centre-Val de Loire
- Department: Indre
- Arrondissement: Le Blanc
- Canton: Le Blanc
- Intercommunality: Brenne Val de Creuse

Government
  - Mayor (2020–2026): Dominique Hervo
- Area^{1}: 25.82 km^{2} (9.97 sq mi)
- Elevation: 80 m (260 ft)
- Highest elevation: 140 m (460 ft)
- Lowest elevation: 64 m (210 ft)
- Population (2023): 1,112
  - Density: 43.07/km^{2} (111.5/sq mi)
- Time zone: UTC+01:00 (CET)
  - Summer (DST): UTC+02:00 (CEST)
- INSEE/Postal code: 36224 /36220
- ^{1} French Land Register data, which excludes lakes, ponds, glaciers > 1 km^{2} (0.386 sq mi or 247 acres) and river estuaries.

Tournon-Saint-Martin (French pronunciation: [tuʁnɔ̃ sɛ̃ maʁtɛ̃]) is a commune in the Indre department in central France.

== Geography ==
The commune is located in natural region Boischaut Nord in the parc naturel régional de la Brenne.

The commune is located on the border of the Indre-et-Loire departement (Centre-Val de Loire region) and near the Vienne departement (Nouvelle-Aquitaine region).

== Population ==
Historical population
Year	Pop.	±% p.a.
1968	1,610	—
1975	1,589	−0.19%
1982	1,506	−0.76%
1990	1,374	−1.14%
1999	1,250	−1.05%
2007	1,230	−0.20%
2012	1,198	−0.53%
2017	1,159	−0.66%
2023	1,112	−0.69%
Source: INSEE

== See also ==
- Communes of the Indre department
