= Mérigny =

- Commune
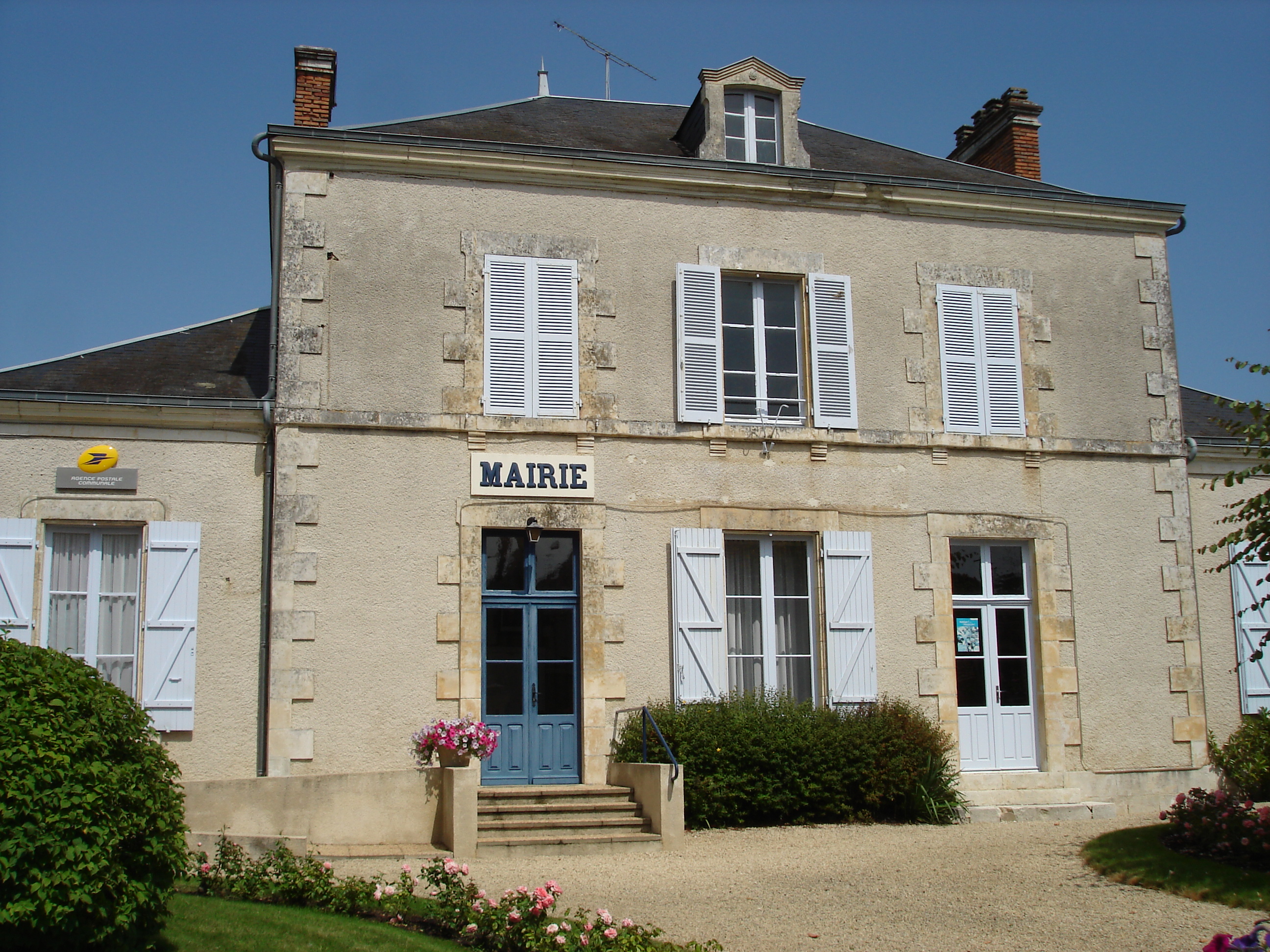
- The town hall in Mérigny
- Location of Mérigny
- Location within France Location within Centre-Val de Loire
- Coordinates: 46°37′55″N 0°55′36″E
- Country: France
- Region: Centre-Val de Loire
- Department: Indre
- Arrondissement: Le Blanc
- Canton: Le Blanc
- Intercommunality: Brenne Val de Creuse

Government
  - Mayor (2024–2026): Patrice Confolant
- Area^{1}: 31.77 km^{2} (12.27 sq mi)
- Elevation: 76 m (249 ft)
- Highest elevation: 136 m (446 ft)
- Lowest elevation: 67 m (220 ft)
- Population (2023): 545
  - Density: 17.2/km^{2} (44.4/sq mi)
- Time zone: UTC+01:00 (CET)
  - Summer (DST): UTC+02:00 (CEST)
- INSEE/Postal code: 36119 /36220
- ^{1} French Land Register data, which excludes lakes, ponds, glaciers > 1 km^{2} (0.386 sq mi or 247 acres) and river estuaries.

Mérigny (French pronunciation: [meʁiɲi]) is a commune in the Indre department in central France.

== Geography ==
The commune is located in the parc naturel régional de la Brenne.

The Anglin flows northwest through the middle of the commune, then forms its northwestern border.

== Population ==
Historical population
Year	Pop.	±% p.a.
1968	767	—
1975	700	−1.30%
1982	570	−2.89%
1990	563	−0.15%
1999	571	+0.16%
2007	566	−0.11%
2012	546	−0.72%
2017	537	−0.33%
2023	545	+0.25%
Source: INSEE

== See also ==
- Communes of the Indre department
- Plaincourault Chapel
