= Lurais =

- Commune
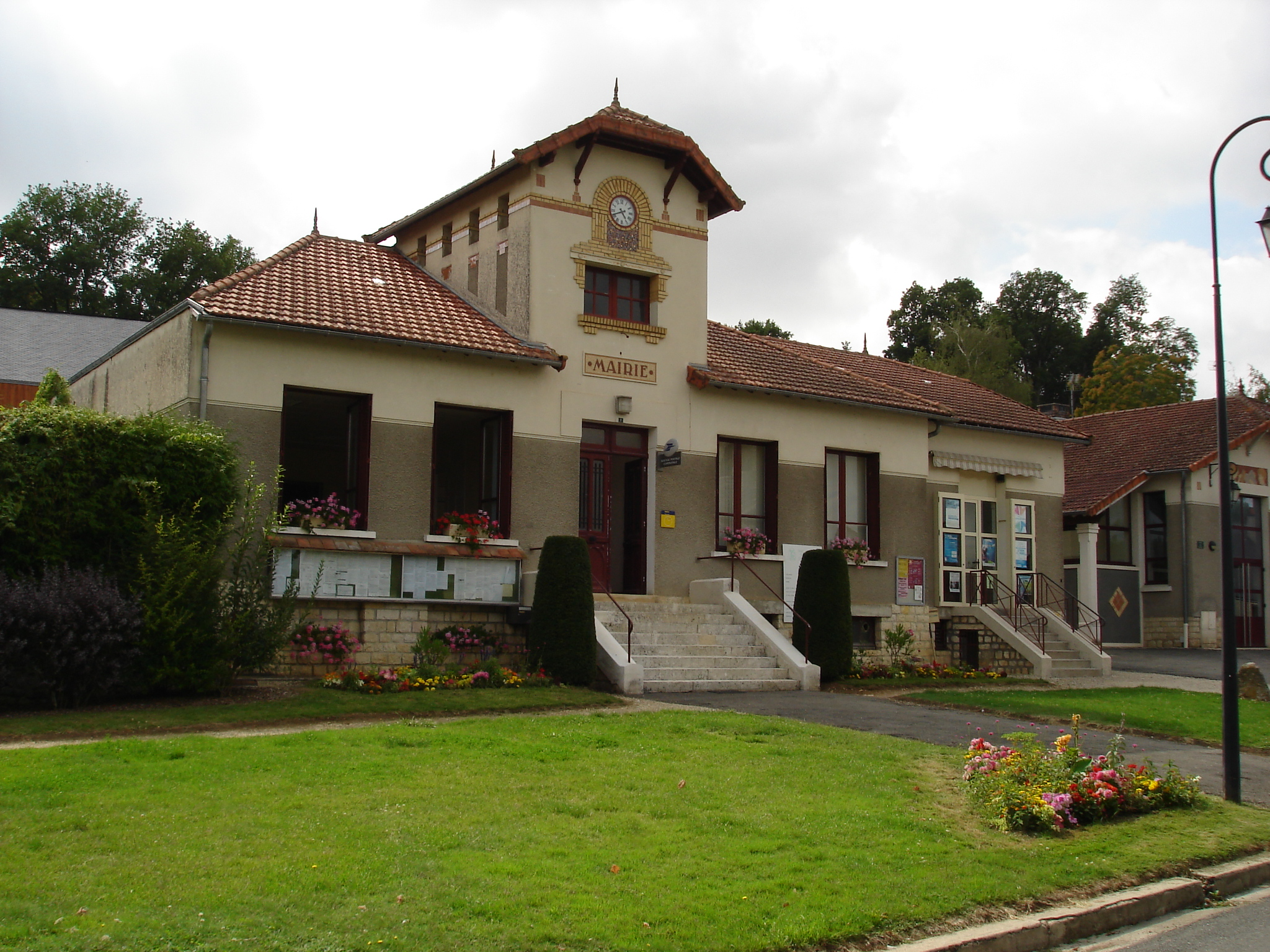
- The town hall in Lurais
- Location of Lurais
- Location within France Location within Centre-Val de Loire
- Coordinates: 46°42′19″N 0°57′05″E
- Country: France
- Region: Centre-Val de Loire
- Department: Indre
- Arrondissement: Le Blanc
- Canton: Le Blanc
- Intercommunality: Brenne Val de Creuse

Government
  - Mayor (2020–2026): Alain Jacquet
- Area^{1}: 13.61 km^{2} (5.25 sq mi)
- Elevation: 80 m (260 ft)
- Highest elevation: 134 m (440 ft)
- Lowest elevation: 67 m (220 ft)
- Population (2023): 226
  - Density: 16.6/km^{2} (43.0/sq mi)
- Time zone: UTC+01:00 (CET)
  - Summer (DST): UTC+02:00 (CEST)
- INSEE/Postal code: 36104 /36220
- ^{1} French Land Register data, which excludes lakes, ponds, glaciers > 1 km^{2} (0.386 sq mi or 247 acres) and river estuaries.

Lurais (French pronunciation: [lyʁɛ]) is a commune in the Indre department in central France.

== Geography ==
The commune is located in the parc naturel régional de la Brenne.

== Population ==
Historical population
Year	Pop.	±% p.a.
1968	303	—
1975	267	−1.79%
1982	250	−0.94%
1990	241	−0.46%
1999	237	−0.19%
2007	239	+0.11%
2012	227	−1.02%
2017	249	+1.87%
2023	226	−1.60%
Source: INSEE

== See also ==
- Communes of the Indre department
