= Lingé =

- Commune
- Location of Lingé
- Location within France Location within Centre-Val de Loire
- Coordinates: 46°45′21″N 1°05′05″E
- Country: France
- Region: Centre-Val de Loire
- Department: Indre
- Arrondissement: Le Blanc
- Canton: Le Blanc

Government
  - Mayor (2022–2026): Adrien Barre
- Area^{1}: 32.66 km^{2} (12.61 sq mi)
- Elevation: 100 m (330 ft)
- Highest elevation: 147 m (482 ft)
- Lowest elevation: 77 m (253 ft)
- Population (2023): 201
  - Density: 6.15/km^{2} (15.9/sq mi)
- Time zone: UTC+01:00 (CET)
  - Summer (DST): UTC+02:00 (CEST)
- INSEE/Postal code: 36096 /36220
- ^{1} French Land Register data, which excludes lakes, ponds, glaciers > 1 km^{2} (0.386 sq mi or 247 acres) and river estuaries.

Lingé (French pronunciation: [lɛ̃ʒe]) is a commune in the Indre department in central France.

== Population ==
Historical population
Year	Pop.	±% p.a.
1968	354	—
1975	276	−3.49%
1982	286	+0.51%
1990	263	−1.04%
1999	238	−1.10%
2007	280	+2.05%
2012	240	−3.04%
2017	229	−0.93%
2023	201	−2.15%
Source: INSEE

== See also ==
- Communes of the Indre department
