= Néons-sur-Creuse =

- Commune
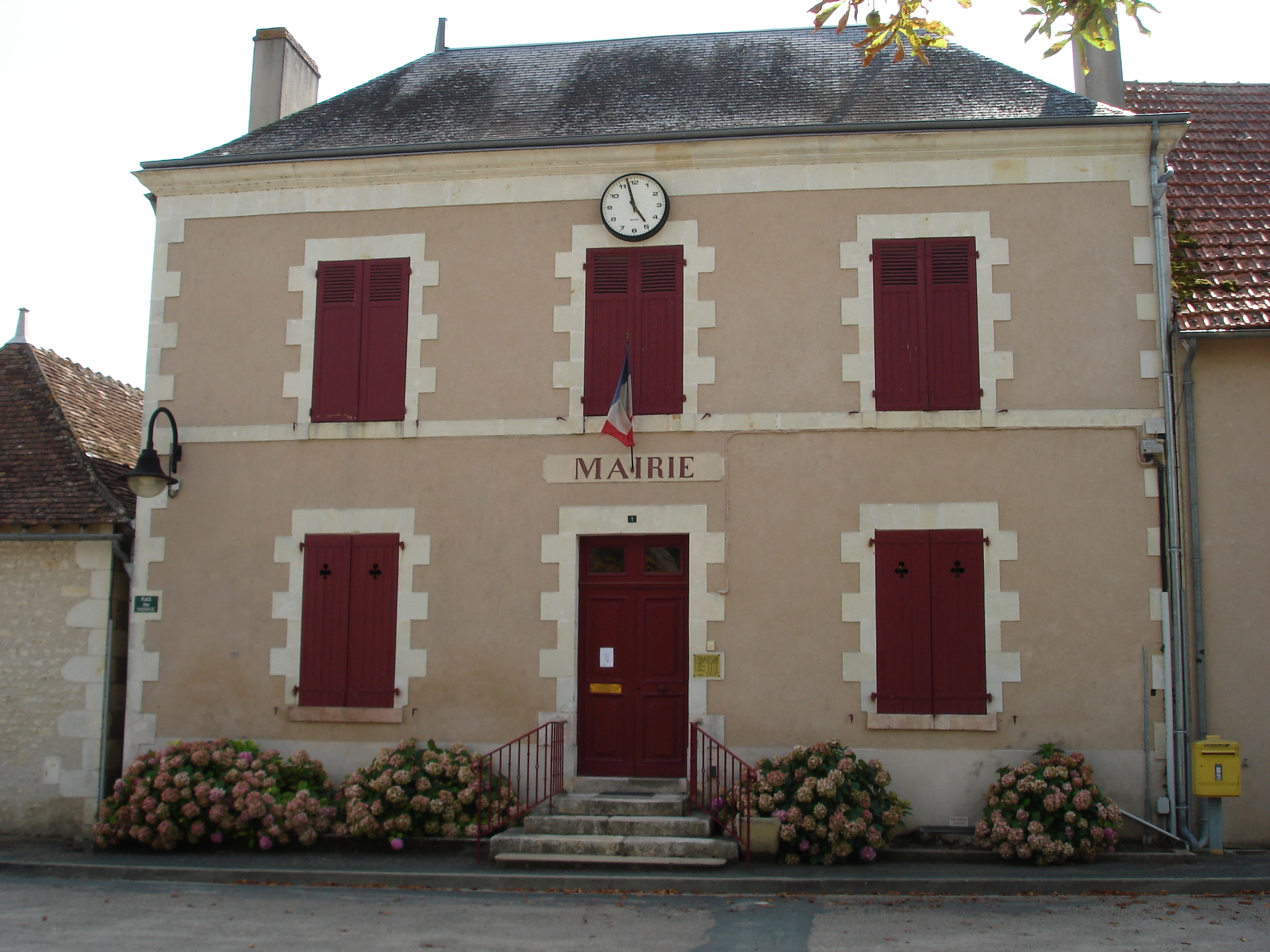
- The town hall in Néons-sur-Creuse
- Location of Néons-sur-Creuse
- Location within France Location within Centre-Val de Loire
- Coordinates: 46°44′50″N 0°55′47″E
- Country: France
- Region: Centre-Val de Loire
- Department: Indre
- Arrondissement: Le Blanc
- Canton: Le Blanc
- Intercommunality: Brenne Val de Creuse

Government
  - Mayor (2020–2026): Jean Secheresse
- Area^{1}: 19.85 km^{2} (7.66 sq mi)
- Elevation: 150 m (490 ft)
- Highest elevation: 132 m (433 ft)
- Lowest elevation: 59 m (194 ft)
- Population (2023): 351
  - Density: 17.7/km^{2} (45.8/sq mi)
- Time zone: UTC+01:00 (CET)
  - Summer (DST): UTC+02:00 (CEST)
- INSEE/Postal code: 36137 /36220
- ^{1} French Land Register data, which excludes lakes, ponds, glaciers > 1 km^{2} (0.386 sq mi or 247 acres) and river estuaries.

Néons-sur-Creuse (French pronunciation: [neɔ̃ syʁ kʁøz], literally Néons on Creuse) is a commune in the Indre department in central France.

== Geography ==
The commune is located in the parc naturel régional de la Brenne.

The river Creuse forms all of the commune's eastern border; the river Gartempe forms part of its western border.

== Population ==
Historical population
Year	Pop.	±% p.a.
1968	485	—
1975	404	−2.58%
1982	414	+0.35%
1990	372	−1.33%
1999	389	+0.50%
2007	394	+0.16%
2012	402	+0.40%
2017	381	−1.07%
2023	351	−1.36%
Source: INSEE

== See also ==
- Communes of the Indre department
