= Rivarennes, Indre =

Rivarennes
- Commune
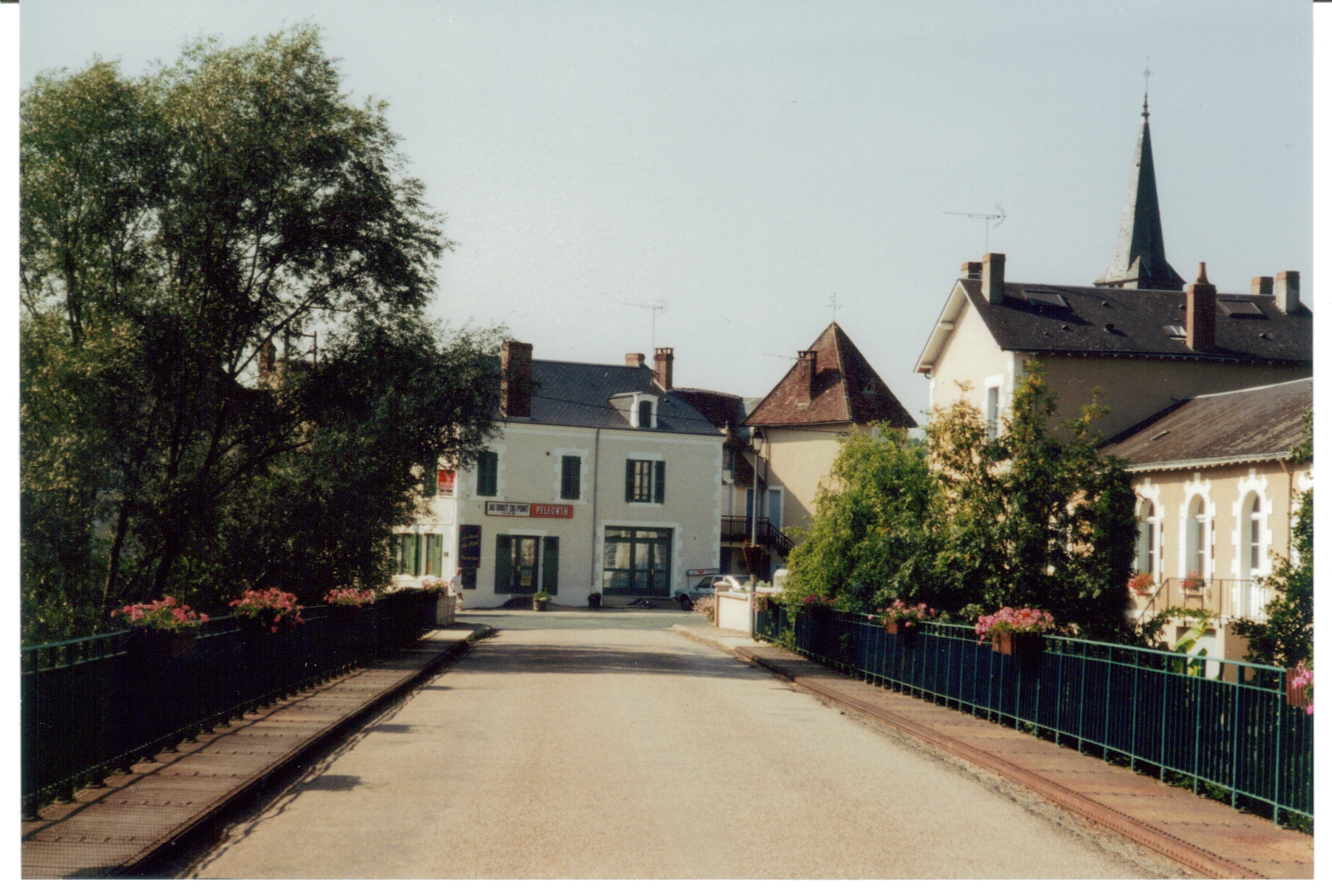
- The road into Rivarennes
- Location of Rivarennes
- Location within France Location within Centre-Val de Loire
- Coordinates: 46°38′11″N 1°23′11″E
- Country: France
- Region: Centre-Val de Loire
- Department: Indre
- Arrondissement: Le Blanc
- Canton: Saint-Gaultier
- Intercommunality: Brenne Val de Creuse

Government
  - Mayor (2020–2026): Joël Darnault
- Area^{1}: 37.41 km^{2} (14.44 sq mi)
- Elevation: 97 m (318 ft)
- Highest elevation: 171 m (561 ft)
- Lowest elevation: 88 m (289 ft)
- Population (2023): 482
  - Density: 12.9/km^{2} (33.4/sq mi)
- Time zone: UTC+01:00 (CET)
  - Summer (DST): UTC+02:00 (CEST)
- INSEE/Postal code: 36172 /36800
- ^{1} French Land Register data, which excludes lakes, ponds, glaciers > 1 km^{2} (0.386 sq mi or 247 acres) and river estuaries.

Rivarennes (French pronunciation: [ʁivaʁɛn]) is a commune in the Indre department in central France.

== Geography ==
The commune is located in the parc naturel régional de la Brenne.

== Population ==
Historical population
Year	Pop.	±% p.a.
1968	646	—
1975	543	−2.45%
1982	508	−0.95%
1990	536	+0.67%
1999	544	+0.16%
2007	561	+0.39%
2012	601	+1.39%
2017	566	−1.19%
2023	482	−2.64%
Source: INSEE

== See also ==
- Communes of the Indre department
