= Sauzelles =

- Commune
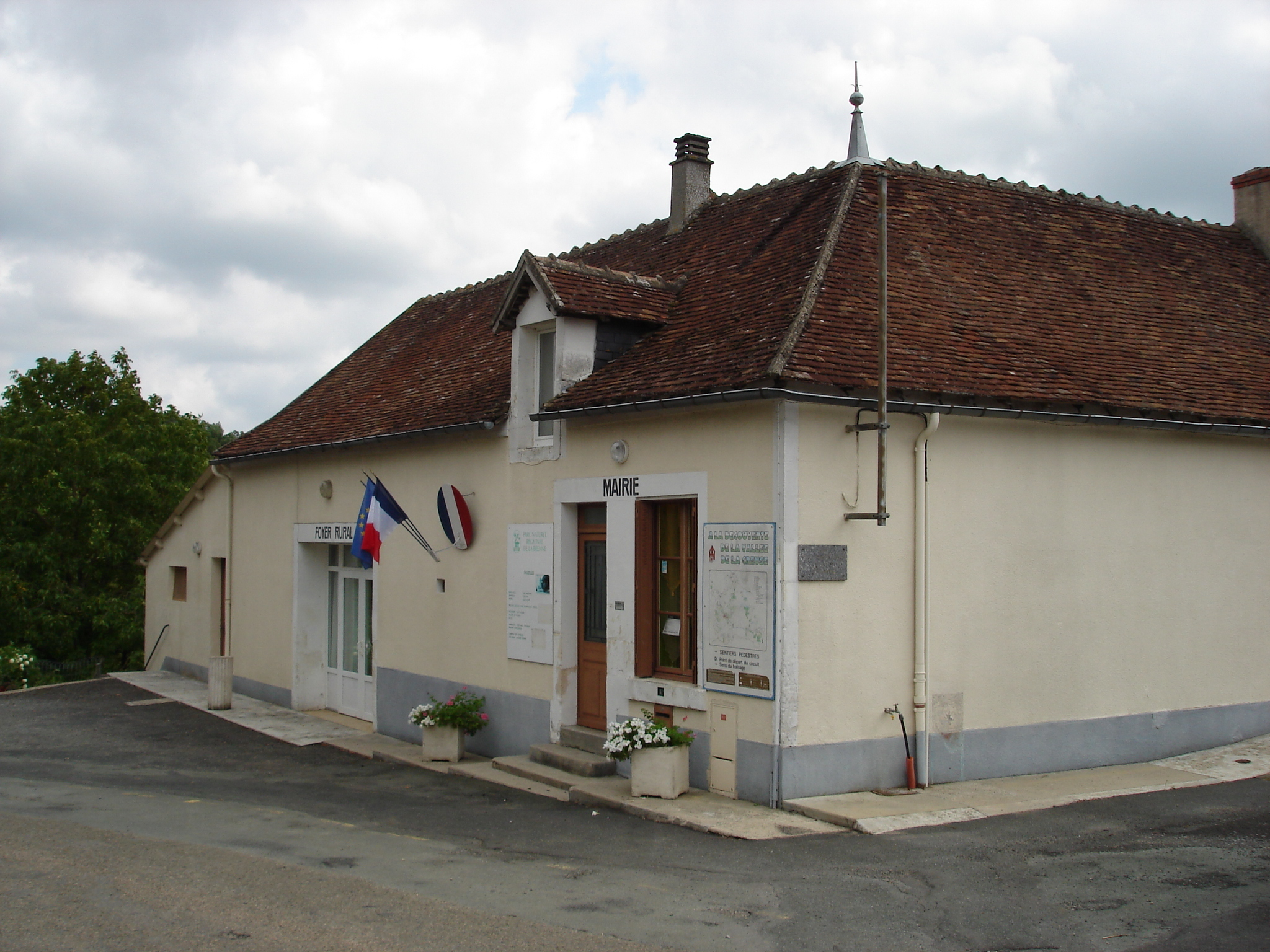
- The town hall in Sauzelles
- Location of Sauzelles
- Location within France Location within Centre-Val de Loire
- Coordinates: 46°39′54″N 1°00′12″E
- Country: France
- Region: Centre-Val de Loire
- Department: Indre
- Arrondissement: Le Blanc
- Canton: Le Blanc
- Intercommunality: Brenne Val de Creuse

Government
  - Mayor (2020–2026): Martial Drui
- Area^{1}: 12.86 km^{2} (4.97 sq mi)
- Elevation: 130 m (430 ft)
- Highest elevation: 134 m (440 ft)
- Lowest elevation: 72 m (236 ft)
- Population (2023): 245
  - Density: 19.1/km^{2} (49.3/sq mi)
- Time zone: UTC+01:00 (CET)
  - Summer (DST): UTC+02:00 (CEST)
- INSEE/Postal code: 36213 /36220
- ^{1} French Land Register data, which excludes lakes, ponds, glaciers > 1 km^{2} (0.386 sq mi or 247 acres) and river estuaries.

Sauzelles (French pronunciation: [sozɛl]) is a commune in the Indre department in central France.

== Geography ==
The commune is located in the parc naturel régional de la Brenne.

== Population ==
Historical population
Year	Pop.	±% p.a.
1968	304	—
1975	303	−0.05%
1982	288	−0.72%
1990	269	−0.85%
1999	232	−1.63%
2007	250	+0.94%
2012	235	−1.23%
2017	245	+0.84%
2023	245	+0.00%
Source: INSEE

== See also ==
- Communes of the Indre department
