= Fontgombault =

- Commune
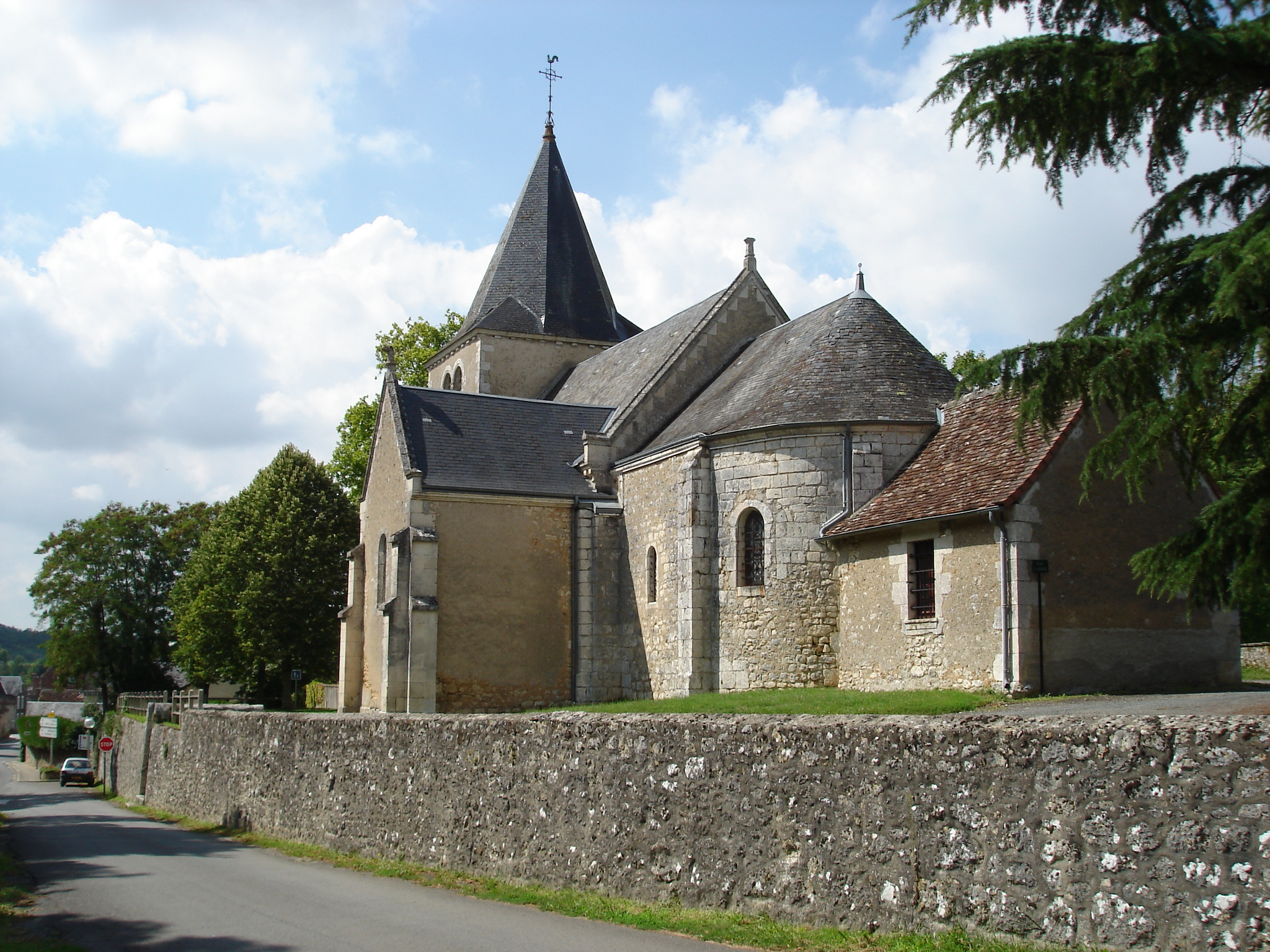
- The church of Saint-Jacques, in Fontgombault
- Location of Fontgombault
- Location within France Location within Centre-Val de Loire
- Coordinates: 46°40′30″N 0°59′10″E
- Country: France
- Region: Centre-Val de Loire
- Department: Indre
- Arrondissement: Le Blanc
- Canton: Le Blanc
- Intercommunality: Brenne Val de Creuse

Government
  - Mayor (2020–2026): Philippe Confolant
- Area^{1}: 10.58 km^{2} (4.08 sq mi)
- Elevation: 111 m (364 ft)
- Highest elevation: 136 m (446 ft)
- Lowest elevation: 67 m (220 ft)
- Population (2023): 268
  - Density: 25.3/km^{2} (65.6/sq mi)
- Time zone: UTC+01:00 (CET)
  - Summer (DST): UTC+02:00 (CEST)
- INSEE/Postal code: 36076 /36220
- ^{1} French Land Register data, which excludes lakes, ponds, glaciers > 1 km^{2} (0.386 sq mi or 247 acres) and river estuaries.

Fontgombault (French pronunciation: [fɔ̃ɡɔ̃bo]) is a commune in the Indre department in central France. It is known for Fontgombault Abbey, a Benedictine monastery famous for its Gregorian chant and traditional liturgy.

== Geography ==
The commune is located in the parc naturel régional de la Brenne.

== Population ==
Historical population
Year	Pop.	±% p.a.
1968	324	—
1975	310	−0.63%
1982	267	−2.11%
1990	310	+1.88%
1999	283	−1.01%
2007	269	−0.63%
2012	252	−1.30%
2017	249	−0.24%
2023	268	+1.23%
Source: INSEE

== See also ==
- Communes of the Indre department
