= Canton of Le Blanc =

Coordinates: 46.64°N 1.07°E

The canton of Le Blanc is an administrative division of the Indre department, central France. Its borders were modified at the French canton reorganisation which came into effect in March 2015. Its seat is in Le Blanc.

It consists of the following communes:

1. Azay-le-Ferron
2. Le Blanc
3. Ciron
4. Concremiers
5. Douadic
6. Fontgombault
7. Ingrandes
8. Lingé
9. Lurais
10. Lureuil
11. Martizay
12. Mérigny
13. Mézières-en-Brenne
14. Néons-sur-Creuse
15. Obterre
16. Paulnay
17. Pouligny-Saint-Pierre
18. Preuilly-la-Ville
19. Rosnay
20. Ruffec
21. Saint-Aigny
22. Sainte-Gemme
23. Saint-Michel-en-Brenne
24. Saulnay
25. Sauzelles
26. Tournon-Saint-Martin
27. Villiers
