= Canton of Saint-Benoît-du-Sault =

Coordinates: 46.44139°N 1.39139°E

Saint-Benoît-du-Sault
- Former canton
- Interactive map of Saint-Benoît-du-Sault
- Country: France
- Region: Centre-Val de Loire
- Department: Indre
- No. of communes: {{{nbcomm}}}
- Disbanded: 2015
- Area: 318.81 km^{2} (123.09 sq mi)
- Population (2012): 5,139
  - Density: 16.12/km^{2} (41.75/sq mi)

The Canton of Saint-Benoît-du-Sault is a French former administrative subdivision, situated in the Indre département and the Centre région. It had 5,139 inhabitants (2012). It was disbanded following the French canton reorganisation which came into effect in March 2015. It consisted of 14 communes, which joined the canton of Saint-Gaultier in 2015.

== Geography ==
The Canton of Saint-Benoît-du-Sault is in the Arrondissement of Le Blanc. Its altitude varies from 112 m (Dunet) to 344 m (Mouhet), with a median altitude of 218 meters above sea level.

The canton comprised the following communes:

- Beaulieu
- Bonneuil
- Chaillac
- La Châtre-Langlin
- Chazelet
- Dunet
- Mouhet
- Parnac
- Roussines
- Sacierges-Saint-Martin
- Saint-Benoît-du-Sault
- Saint-Civran
- Saint-Gilles
- Vigoux

== Demography ==
Census figures for Canton of Saint-Benoît-du-Sault
Year	Pop.
1962	6,800
1968	7,455
1975	6,871
1982	6,219
1990	5,846
1999	5,432

== Administration ==
The last conseiller général was Gérard Mayaud, of the UDF.

== See also ==
- Arrondissements of the Indre department
- Cantons of the Indre department
- Communes of the Indre department
