= Prissac =

- Commune
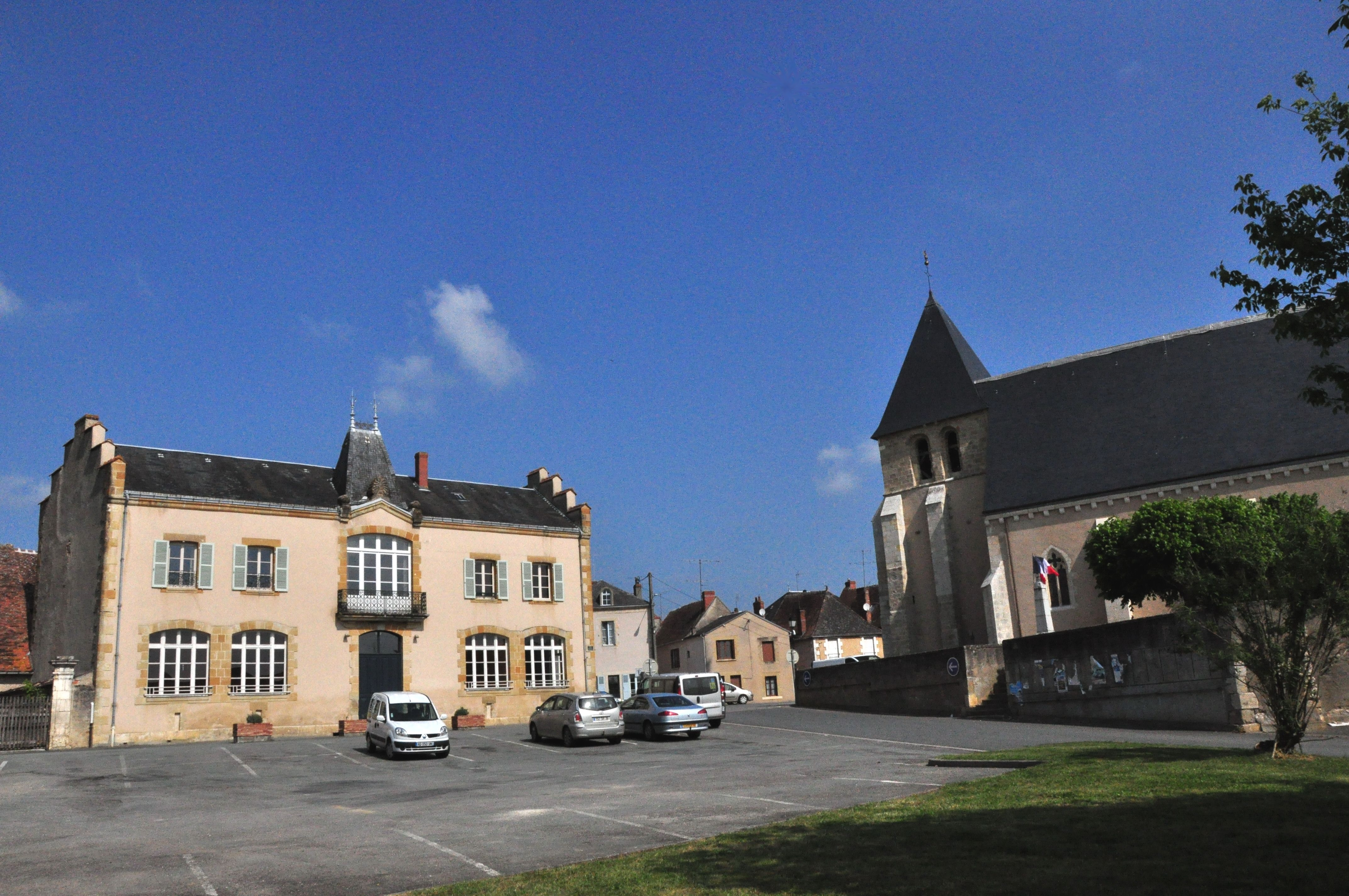
- The 8 May Square in Prissac
- Location of Prissac
- Location within France Location within Centre-Val de Loire
- Coordinates: 46°30′39″N 1°18′31″E
- Country: France
- Region: Centre-Val de Loire
- Department: Indre
- Arrondissement: Le Blanc
- Canton: Saint-Gaultier

Government
  - Mayor (2020–2026): Gilles Touzet
- Area^{1}: 62.83 km^{2} (24.26 sq mi)
- Elevation: 165 m (541 ft)
- Highest elevation: 199 m (653 ft)
- Lowest elevation: 105 m (344 ft)
- Population (2023): 576
  - Density: 9.17/km^{2} (23.7/sq mi)
- Time zone: UTC+01:00 (CET)
  - Summer (DST): UTC+02:00 (CEST)
- INSEE/Postal code: 36168 /36370
- ^{1} French Land Register data, which excludes lakes, ponds, glaciers > 1 km^{2} (0.386 sq mi or 247 acres) and river estuaries.

Prissac (French pronunciation: [pʁisak]) is a commune in the Indre department in central France. Gaston Chérau (1872–1937), a writer and member of the Académie Goncourt is buried in Prissac.

== Geography ==
The commune is located in the parc naturel régional de la Brenne.

The river Abloux flows west through the southern part of the commune, then flows into the Anglin, which forms all of its southwestern border.

== Population ==
Historical population
Year	Pop.	±% p.a.
1968	966	—
1975	892	−1.13%
1982	853	−0.64%
1990	771	−1.26%
1999	738	−0.48%
2007	694	−0.77%
2012	666	−0.82%
2017	613	−1.64%
2023	576	−1.03%
Source: INSEE

== See also ==
- Communes of the Indre department
