= Méobecq =

- Commune
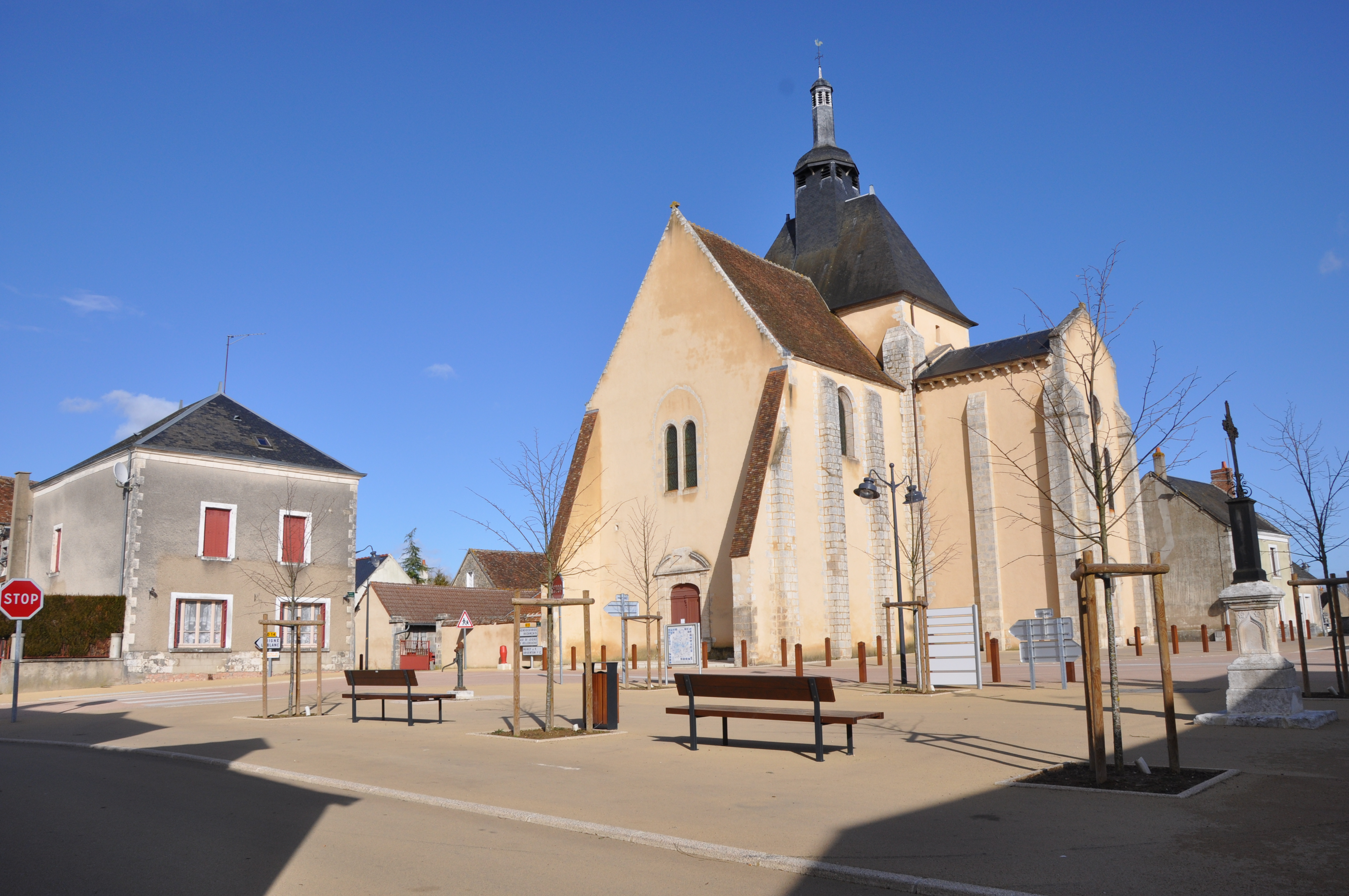
- The church and central square in Méobecq
- Location of Méobecq
- Location within France Location within Centre-Val de Loire
- Coordinates: 46°44′20″N 1°24′47″E
- Country: France
- Region: Centre-Val de Loire
- Department: Indre
- Arrondissement: Châteauroux
- Canton: Saint-Gaultier
- Intercommunality: Val de l'Indre-Brenne

Government
  - Mayor (2020–2026): Hubert Mousset
- Area^{1}: 35.56 km^{2} (13.73 sq mi)
- Elevation: 122 m (400 ft)
- Highest elevation: 137 m (449 ft)
- Lowest elevation: 110 m (360 ft)
- Population (2023): 361
  - Density: 10.2/km^{2} (26.3/sq mi)
- Time zone: UTC+01:00 (CET)
  - Summer (DST): UTC+02:00 (CEST)
- INSEE/Postal code: 36118 /36500
- ^{1} French Land Register data, which excludes lakes, ponds, glaciers > 1 km^{2} (0.386 sq mi or 247 acres) and river estuaries.

Méobecq (French pronunciation: [meɔbɛk]) is a commune in the Indre department in central France.

== Geography ==
The commune is located in the parc naturel régional de la Brenne.

== Population ==
Historical population
| Year | Pop. | ±% p.a. |
|---|---|---|
| 1968 | 482 | — |
| 1975 | 443 | −1.20% |
| 1982 | 439 | −0.13% |
| 1990 | 402 | −1.09% |
| 1999 | 362 | −1.16% |
| 2007 | 366 | +0.14% |
| 2012 | 360 | −0.33% |
| 2017 | 374 | +0.77% |
| 2023 | 361 | −0.59% |
Source: INSEE

== See also ==
- Communes of the Indre department
