= Lignac =

- Commune
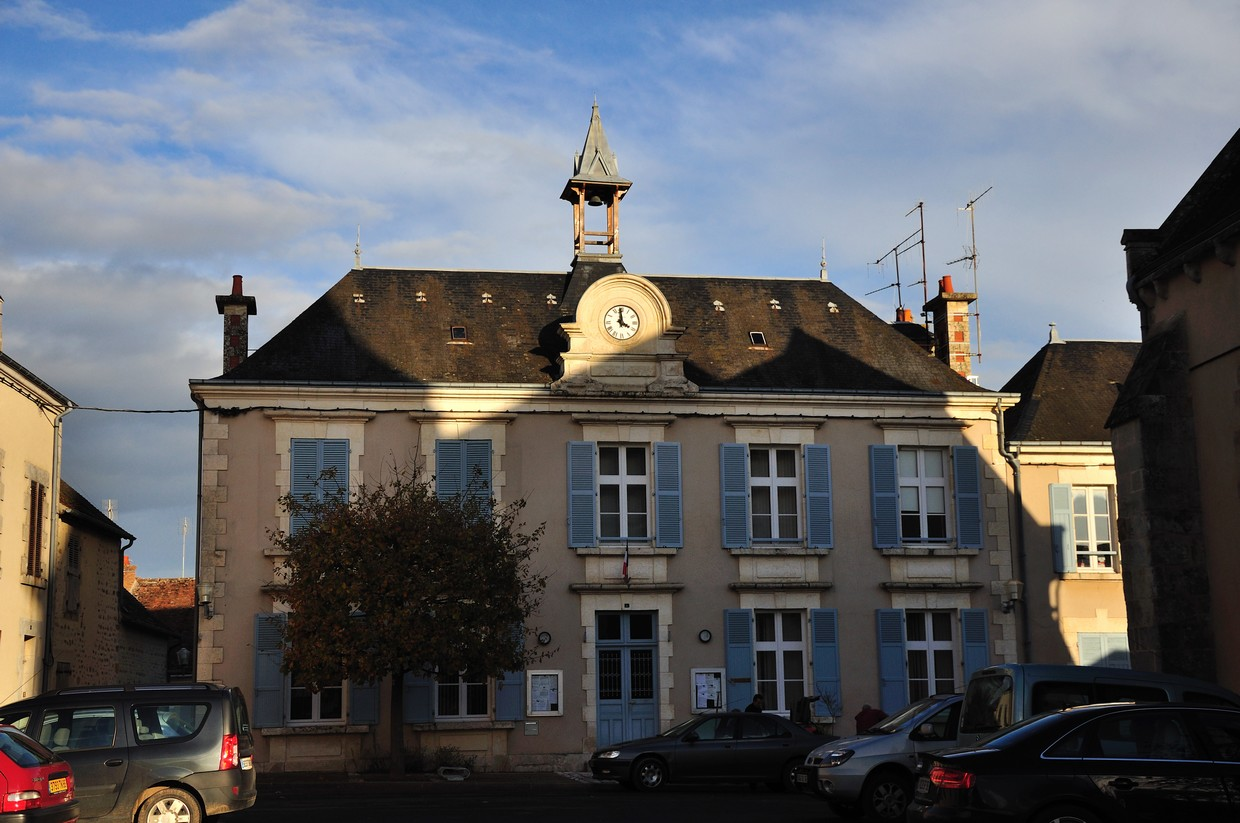
- Town hall
- Location of Lignac
- Location within France Location within Centre-Val de Loire
- Coordinates: 46°28′01″N 1°13′09″E
- Country: France
- Region: Centre-Val de Loire
- Department: Indre
- Arrondissement: Le Blanc
- Canton: Saint-Gaultier
- Intercommunality: Marche Occitane-Val d'Anglin

Government
  - Mayor (2020–2026): Michèle Ballet
- Area^{1}: 67.03 km^{2} (25.88 sq mi)
- Elevation: 160 m (520 ft)
- Highest elevation: 197 m (646 ft)
- Lowest elevation: 104 m (341 ft)
- Population (2023): 457
  - Density: 6.82/km^{2} (17.7/sq mi)
- Demonym(s): Lignacois, Lignacoises
- Time zone: UTC+01:00 (CET)
  - Summer (DST): UTC+02:00 (CEST)
- INSEE/Postal code: 36094 /36370
- ^{1} French Land Register data, which excludes lakes, ponds, glaciers > 1 km^{2} (0.386 sq mi or 247 acres) and river estuaries.

Lignac (French pronunciation: [liɲak]; Limousin: Linhac) is a commune in the Indre department in central France.

== Location ==
Lignac is located in the southwest corner of the department. It borders the ancient regions of Berry, Poitou, and La Marche in the foothills of the Massif Central. The village lies within the parc naturel régional de la Brenne, a region noted for its lakes and wildlife. The river Anglin forms part of the commune's eastern border.

== History ==
The name Lignac is probably of Roman origin. During the Roman occupation a wealthy landowner named Linius apparently lived in the area; there are source references to Liniacum and Villa Linii. Within the commune lies the hamlet of Château Guillaume, which was a commune in its own right up until 1829. The château was at its height between 1087 and 1112 AD when it was the home of William IX, Duke of Aquitaine. It was said to be the home of Eleanor of Aquitaine, consort of King Louis VII of France and King Henry II of England.

The Château of Lignac was constructed during the 15th century in the centre of the village. All that remains today are the feet of two pillars to the old gateway. The Church of St Christophe dates back to the 11th and 12th centuries; there is a mention of the church in department archives from 1630.

== Events ==
- Fêtes Patronal: Last weekend in July; includes repas champetre, brocante, bicycle race, fireworks, fun fair and parade
- Fêtes de Château Guillaume: First Sunday in October
- Christmas market at Château Guillaume on 25 November with local produce, crafts, a special Mass and meal
- Bastille Day lamb barbecue at Lignac "Fanny" pétanque club

== Organizations ==
- The "Fanny" pétanque club meets most Saturdays in the centre of the village
- The U.S. Lignac football club plays in the departmental 4th division
- Familles Rurales: Activities such as gymnastics, painting, calligraphy and children's activities most Wednesdays
- Blood donors
- Lignac Hunt (Société de Chasse)
- Fishing
- Tennis

== Population ==
Historical population
Year	Pop.	±% p.a.
1968	992	—
1975	809	−2.87%
1982	706	−1.93%
1990	614	−1.73%
1999	572	−0.78%
2007	581	+0.20%
2012	538	−1.53%
2017	459	−3.13%
2023	457	−0.07%
Source: INSEE

== See also ==
- Communes of the Indre department
