= Abloux =

River in central France

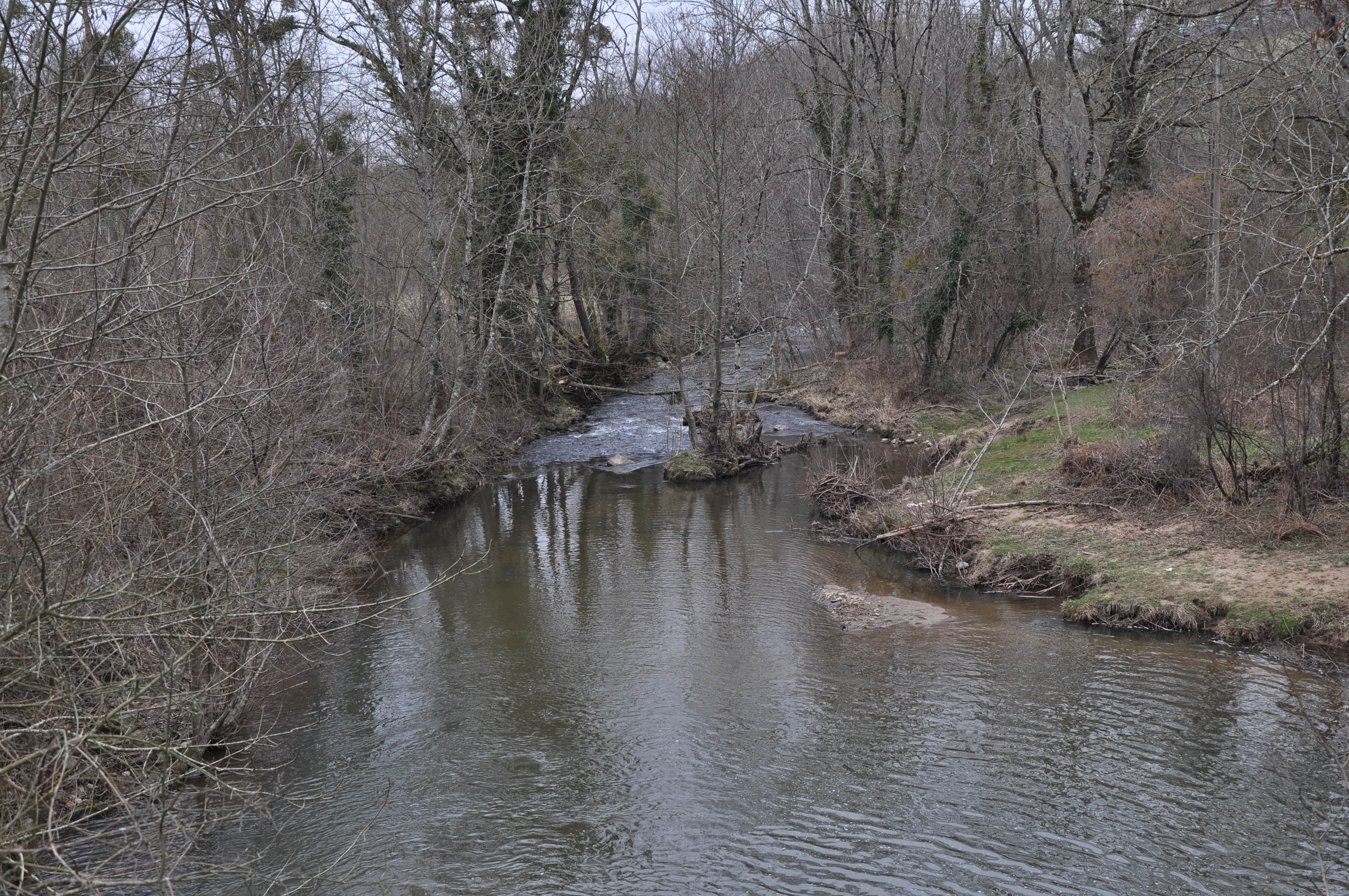

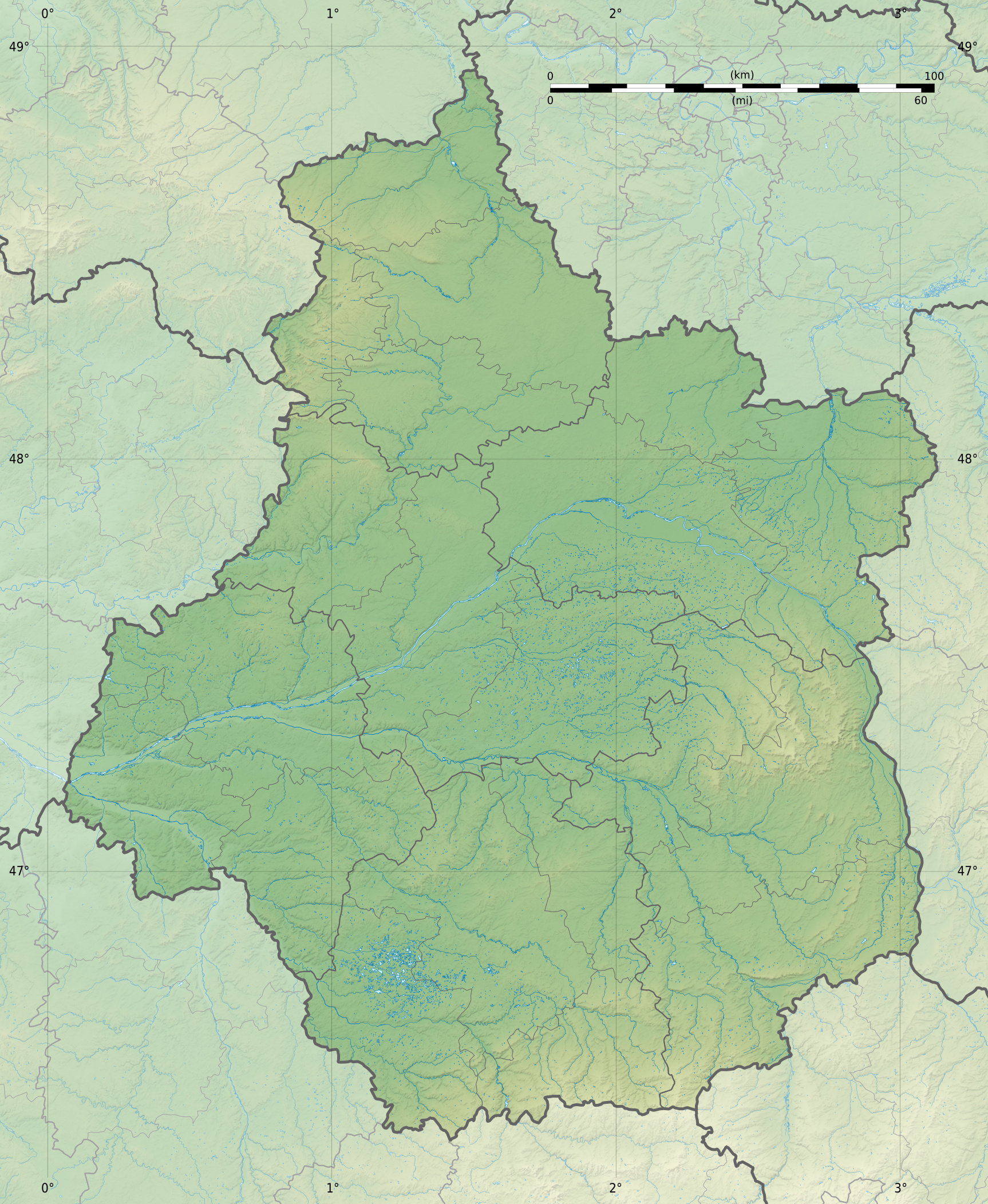
- Location within France Location within Centre-Val de Loire

Location
- Country: France

Physical characteristics
- Source
  - location: Bazelat
  - coordinates: 46°21′23″N 01°31′23″E
  - elevation: 300 m (980 ft)
- Mouth: Anglin
  - location: Prissac
  - coordinates: 46°30′42″N 01°15′04″E
  - elevation: 105 m (344 ft)
- Length: 49.6 km (30.8 mi)

Basin features
- Progression: Anglin→ Gartempe→ Creuse→ Vienne→ Loire→ Atlantic Ocean

The Abloux (French pronunciation: [ablu]) is a 49.6 km (30.8 mi) long river in the Creuse and Indre departments in central France. Its source is at Bazelat. It flows generally northwest. It is a right tributary of the Anglin, into which it flows at Prissac.

== Communes along its course ==
This list is ordered from source to mouth:

- Creuse: Bazelat, Azerables, Saint-Sébastien
- Indre: Parnac, Éguzon-Chantôme, Bazaiges, Vigoux, Saint-Gilles, Chazelet, Saint-Civran, Sacierges-Saint-Martin, Prissac
