= Canton of Saint-Gaultier =

Coordinates: 46.64°N 1.42°E

The canton of Saint-Gaultier is an administrative division of the Indre department, central France. Its borders were modified at the French canton reorganisation which came into effect in March 2015. Its seat is in Saint-Gaultier.

It consists of the following communes:

1. Beaulieu
2. Bélâbre
3. Bonneuil
4. Chaillac
5. Chalais
6. La Châtre-Langlin
7. Chazelet
8. Chitray
9. Dunet
10. Lignac
11. Luant
12. Luzeret
13. Mauvières
14. Méobecq
15. Migné
16. Mouhet
17. Neuillay-les-Bois
18. Nuret-le-Ferron
19. Oulches
20. La Pérouille
21. Parnac
22. Prissac
23. Rivarennes
24. Roussines
25. Sacierges-Saint-Martin
26. Saint-Benoît-du-Sault
27. Saint-Civran
28. Saint-Gaultier
29. Saint-Gilles
30. Saint-Hilaire-sur-Benaize
31. Thenay
32. Tilly
33. Vendœuvres
34. Vigoux
