= Mauvières =

- Commune
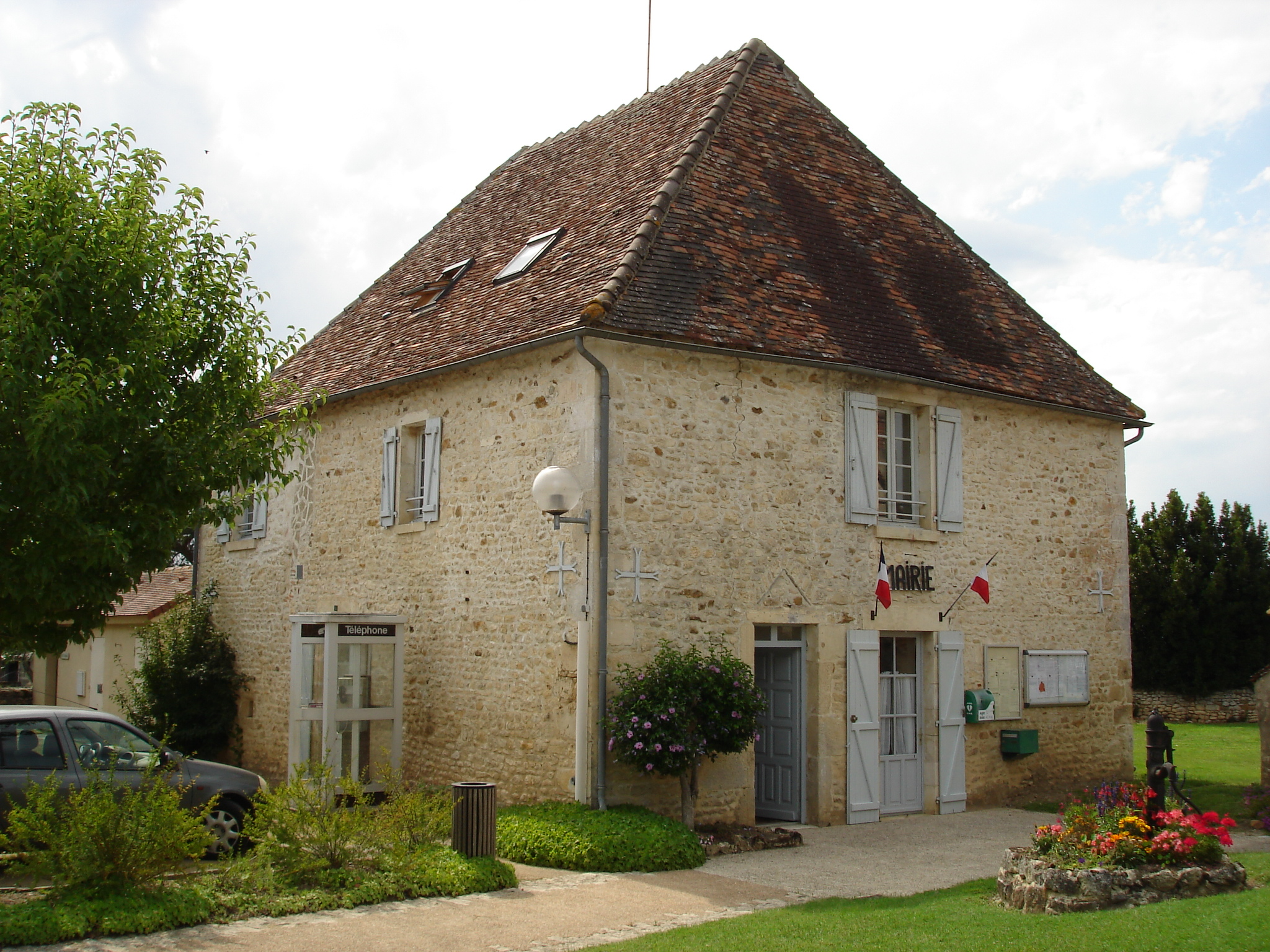
- The town hall in Mauvières

- Coat of arms
- Location of Mauvières
- Location within France Location within Centre-Val de Loire
- Coordinates: 46°34′29″N 1°05′22″E
- Country: France
- Region: Centre-Val de Loire
- Department: Indre
- Arrondissement: Le Blanc
- Canton: Saint-Gaultier

Government
  - Mayor (2020–2026): Christelle Raoui
- Area^{1}: 23.94 km^{2} (9.24 sq mi)
- Elevation: 72 m (236 ft)
- Highest elevation: 147 m (482 ft)
- Lowest elevation: 84 m (276 ft)
- Population (2023): 306
  - Density: 12.8/km^{2} (33.1/sq mi)
- Time zone: UTC+01:00 (CET)
  - Summer (DST): UTC+02:00 (CEST)
- INSEE/Postal code: 36114 /36370
- ^{1} French Land Register data, which excludes lakes, ponds, glaciers > 1 km^{2} (0.386 sq mi or 247 acres) and river estuaries.

Mauvières (French pronunciation: [movjɛʁ]) is a commune in the Indre department in central France.

== Geography ==
The commune is located in the parc naturel régional de la Brenne.

The river Anglin forms most of the commune's western border.

== Population ==
Historical population
Year	Pop.	±% p.a.
1968	351	—
1975	270	−3.68%
1982	243	−1.49%
1990	305	+2.88%
1999	310	+0.18%
2007	329	+0.75%
2012	345	+0.95%
2017	310	−2.12%
2023	306	−0.22%
Source: INSEE

== See also ==
- Communes of the Indre department
