= Bazaiges =

- Commune
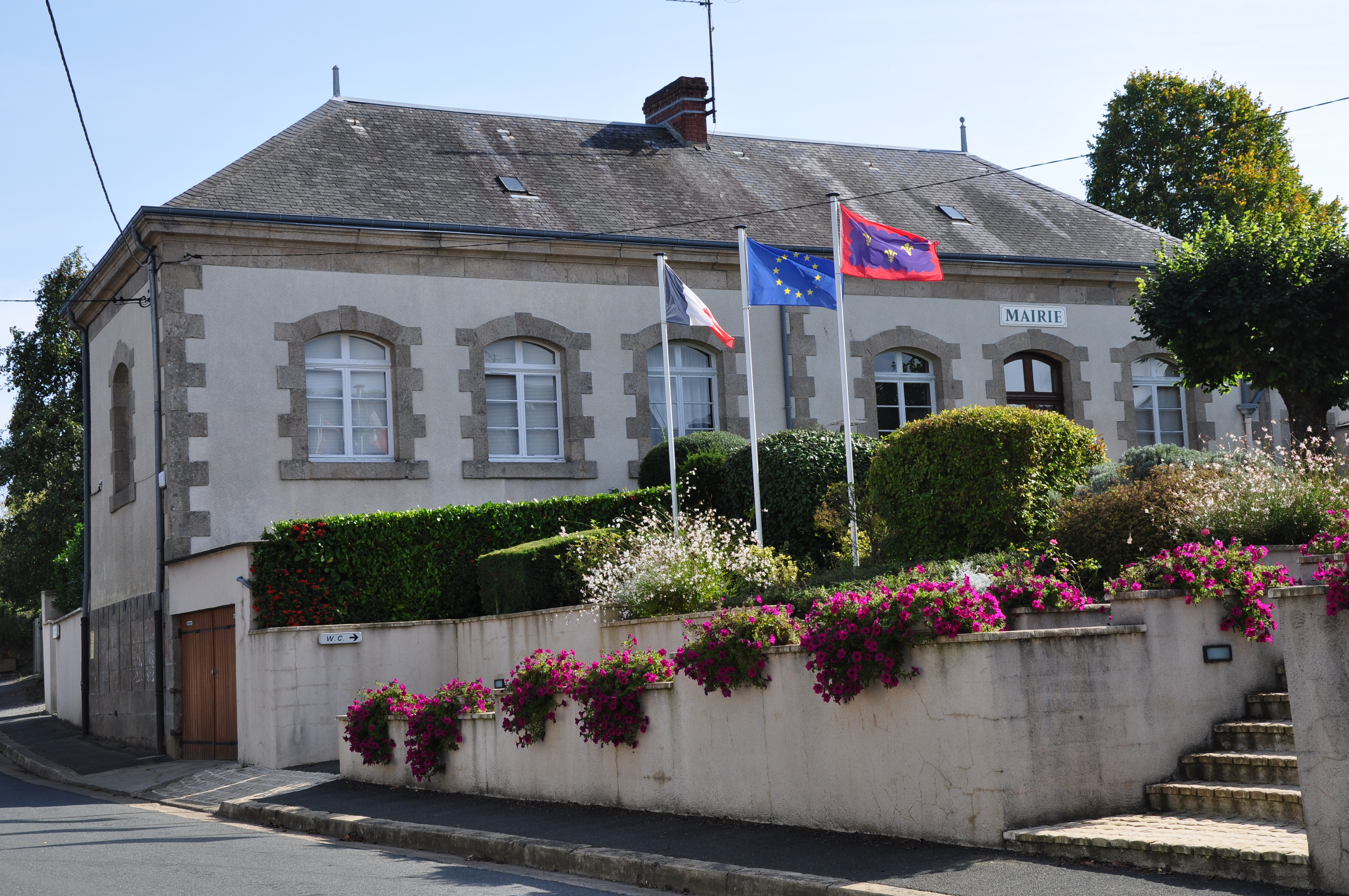
- Town hall
- Location of Bazaiges
- Location within France Location within Centre-Val de Loire
- Coordinates: 46°29′59″N 1°32′03″E
- Country: France
- Region: Centre-Val de Loire
- Department: Indre
- Arrondissement: Châteauroux
- Canton: Argenton-sur-Creuse

Government
  - Mayor (2020–2026): Isabelle Portrait
- Area^{1}: 18.37 km^{2} (7.09 sq mi)
- Elevation: 265 m (869 ft)
- Highest elevation: 280 m (920 ft)
- Lowest elevation: 175 m (574 ft)
- Population (2023): 229
  - Density: 12.5/km^{2} (32.3/sq mi)
- Time zone: UTC+01:00 (CET)
  - Summer (DST): UTC+02:00 (CEST)
- INSEE/Postal code: 36014 /36270
- ^{1} French Land Register data, which excludes lakes, ponds, glaciers > 1 km^{2} (0.386 sq mi or 247 acres) and river estuaries.

Bazaiges (French pronunciation: [bazɛʒ]) is a commune in the Indre département in central France.

== Geography ==
The river Abloux forms part of the commune's southwestern border.

== Population ==
Historical population
Year	Pop.	±% p.a.
1968	382	—
1975	334	−1.90%
1982	306	−1.24%
1990	244	−2.79%
1999	230	−0.65%
2007	232	+0.11%
2012	221	−0.97%
2017	205	−1.49%
2023	229	+1.86%
Source: INSEE

== See also ==
- Communes of the Indre department
