= Neuillay-les-Bois =

- Commune
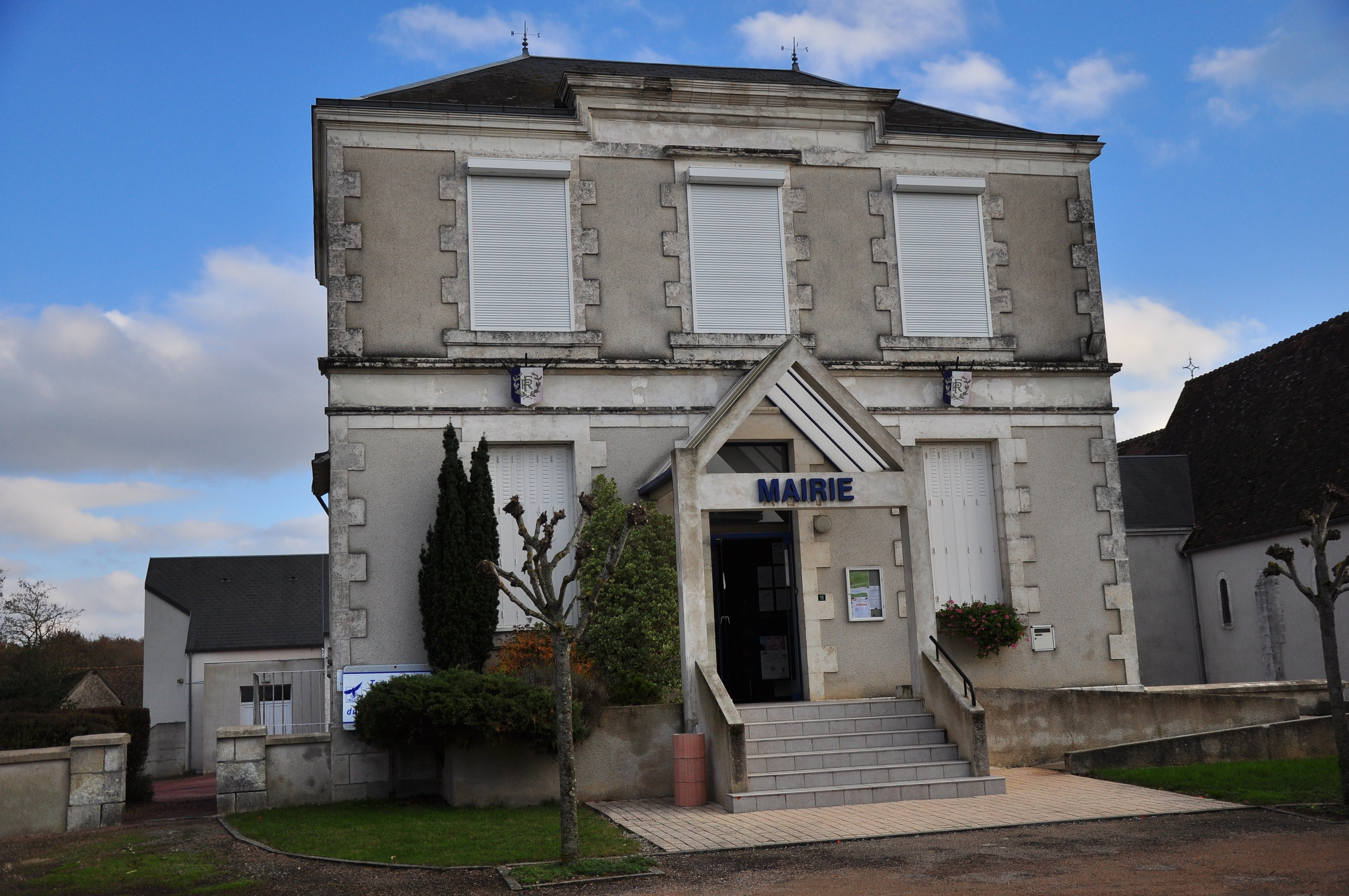
- Town hall
- Location of Neuillay-les-Bois
- Location within France Location within Centre-Val de Loire
- Coordinates: 46°45′58″N 1°28′35″E
- Country: France
- Region: Centre-Val de Loire
- Department: Indre
- Arrondissement: Châteauroux
- Canton: Saint-Gaultier
- Intercommunality: Val de l'Indre-Brenne

Government
  - Mayor (2020–2026): Patrice Boiron
- Area^{1}: 47.63 km^{2} (18.39 sq mi)
- Elevation: 165 m (541 ft)
- Highest elevation: 154 m (505 ft)
- Lowest elevation: 117 m (384 ft)
- Population (2023): 660
  - Density: 14/km^{2} (36/sq mi)
- Time zone: UTC+01:00 (CET)
  - Summer (DST): UTC+02:00 (CEST)
- INSEE/Postal code: 36139 /36500
- ^{1} French Land Register data, which excludes lakes, ponds, glaciers > 1 km^{2} (0.386 sq mi or 247 acres) and river estuaries.

Neuillay-les-Bois (French pronunciation: [nœjɛ le bwa]) is a commune in the Indre department in central France.

== Geography ==
The commune is located in the parc naturel régional de la Brenne.

== Population ==
Historical population
Year	Pop.	±% p.a.
1968	619	—
1975	604	−0.35%
1982	540	−1.59%
1990	609	+1.51%
1999	560	−0.93%
2007	642	+1.72%
2012	680	+1.16%
2017	659	−0.63%
2023	660	+0.03%
Source: INSEE

== See also ==
- Communes of the Indre department
