= Chalais, Indre =

Chalais
- Commune
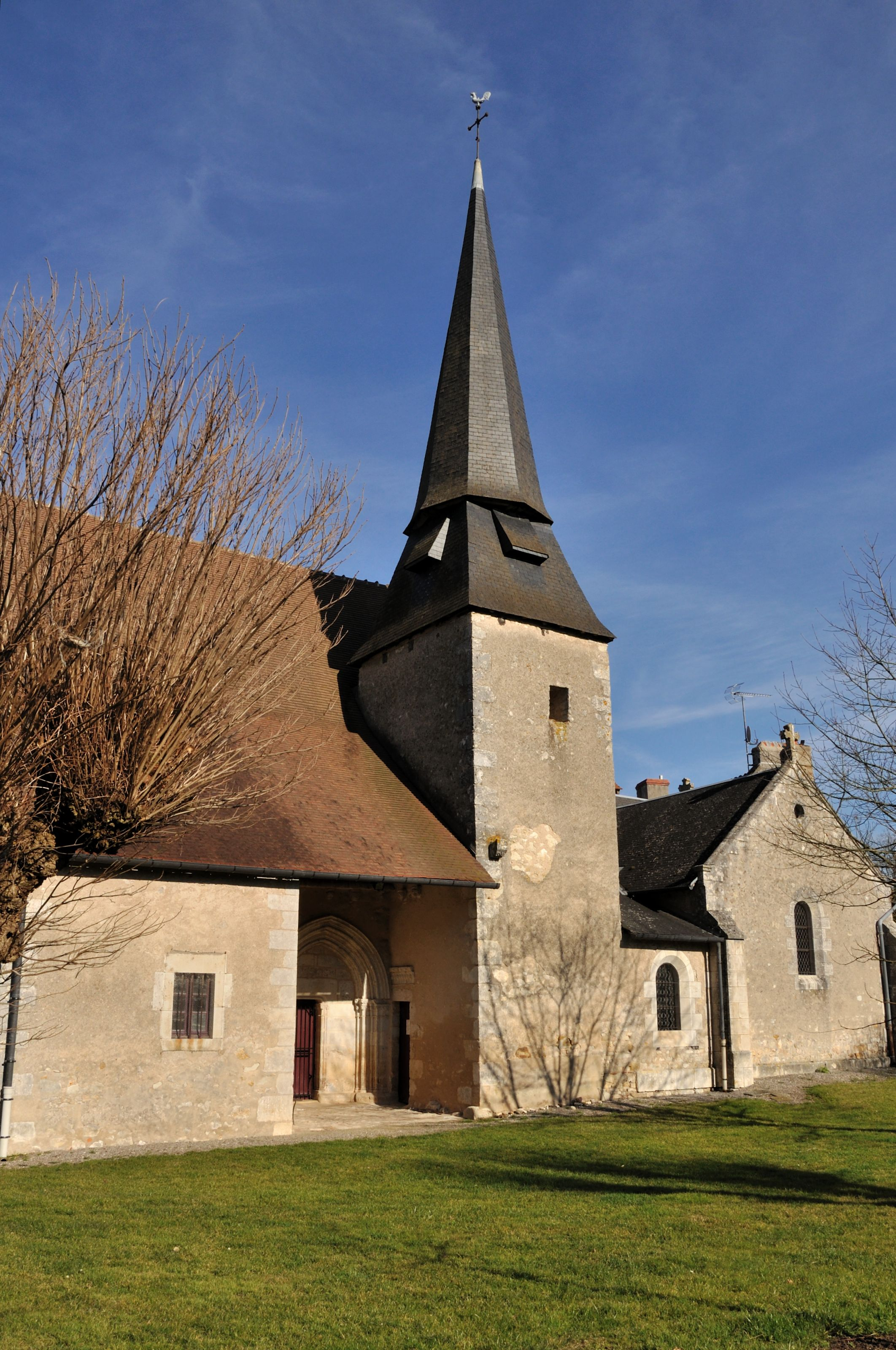
- The church of Saint-Léobon, in Chalais
- Location of Chalais
- Location within France Location within Centre-Val de Loire
- Coordinates: 46°32′15″N 1°11′52″E
- Country: France
- Region: Centre-Val de Loire
- Department: Indre
- Arrondissement: Le Blanc
- Canton: Saint-Gaultier

Government
  - Mayor (2020–2026): Frédérique Vrignat
- Area^{1}: 39.65 km^{2} (15.31 sq mi)
- Elevation: 144 m (472 ft)
- Highest elevation: 161 m (528 ft)
- Lowest elevation: 95 m (312 ft)
- Population (2023): 152
  - Density: 3.83/km^{2} (9.93/sq mi)
- Time zone: UTC+01:00 (CET)
  - Summer (DST): UTC+02:00 (CEST)
- INSEE/Postal code: 36036 /36370
- ^{1} French Land Register data, which excludes lakes, ponds, glaciers > 1 km^{2} (0.386 sq mi or 247 acres) and river estuaries.

Chalais (French pronunciation: [ʃalɛ]) is a commune in the Indre department in central France.

== Geography ==
The commune is located in the parc naturel régional de la Brenne.

The river Anglin flows northwest through the southwestern part of the commune.

== Population ==
Historical population
Year	Pop.	±% p.a.
1968	325	—
1975	257	−3.30%
1982	198	−3.66%
1990	186	−0.78%
1999	165	−1.32%
2007	167	+0.15%
2012	166	−0.12%
2017	140	−3.35%
2023	152	+1.38%
Source: INSEE

== See also ==
- Communes of the Indre department
