= Saint-Hilaire-sur-Benaize =

- Commune
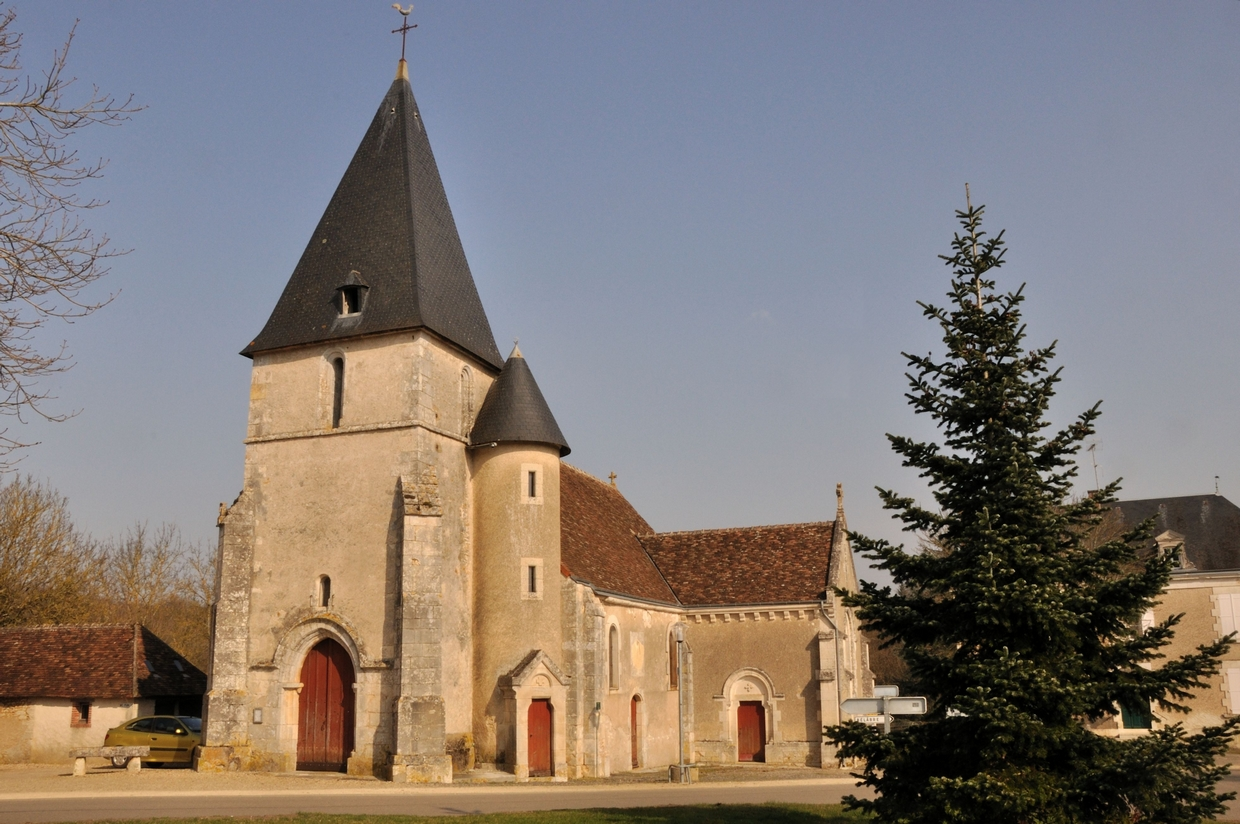
- The church of Saint-Hilaire, in Saint-Hilaire-sur-Benaize

- Coat of arms
- Location of Saint-Hilaire-sur-Benaize
- Location within France Location within Centre-Val de Loire
- Coordinates: 46°33′46″N 1°04′32″E
- Country: France
- Region: Centre-Val de Loire
- Department: Indre
- Arrondissement: Le Blanc
- Canton: Saint-Gaultier
- Intercommunality: Marche Occitane - Val d'Anglin

Government
  - Mayor (2020–2026): Marie-Laure Frisch
- Area^{1}: 32.61 km^{2} (12.59 sq mi)
- Elevation: 93 m (305 ft)
- Highest elevation: 146 m (479 ft)
- Lowest elevation: 82 m (269 ft)
- Population (2023): 311
  - Density: 9.54/km^{2} (24.7/sq mi)
- Time zone: UTC+01:00 (CET)
  - Summer (DST): UTC+02:00 (CEST)
- INSEE/Postal code: 36197 /36370
- ^{1} French Land Register data, which excludes lakes, ponds, glaciers > 1 km^{2} (0.386 sq mi or 247 acres) and river estuaries.

Saint-Hilaire-sur-Benaize (French pronunciation: [sɛ̃.t‿ilɛʁ syʁ bənɛz], literally Saint-Hilaire on Benaize) is a commune in the Indre department in central France.

== Geography ==
The commune is located in the parc naturel régional de la Brenne.

The river Benaize forms part of the commune's southern border, flows north through the commune, crossing the village of Saint-Hilaire-sur-Benaize, then flows into the Anglin, which forms part of the commune's northeastern border.

== Population ==
Historical population
Year	Pop.	±% p.a.
1968	463	—
1975	365	−3.34%
1982	329	−1.47%
1990	293	−1.44%
1999	303	+0.37%
2007	351	+1.86%
2012	356	+0.28%
2017	302	−3.24%
2023	311	+0.49%
Source: INSEE

== See also ==
- Communes of the Indre department
