= Saint-Benoît-du-Sault =

- Commune
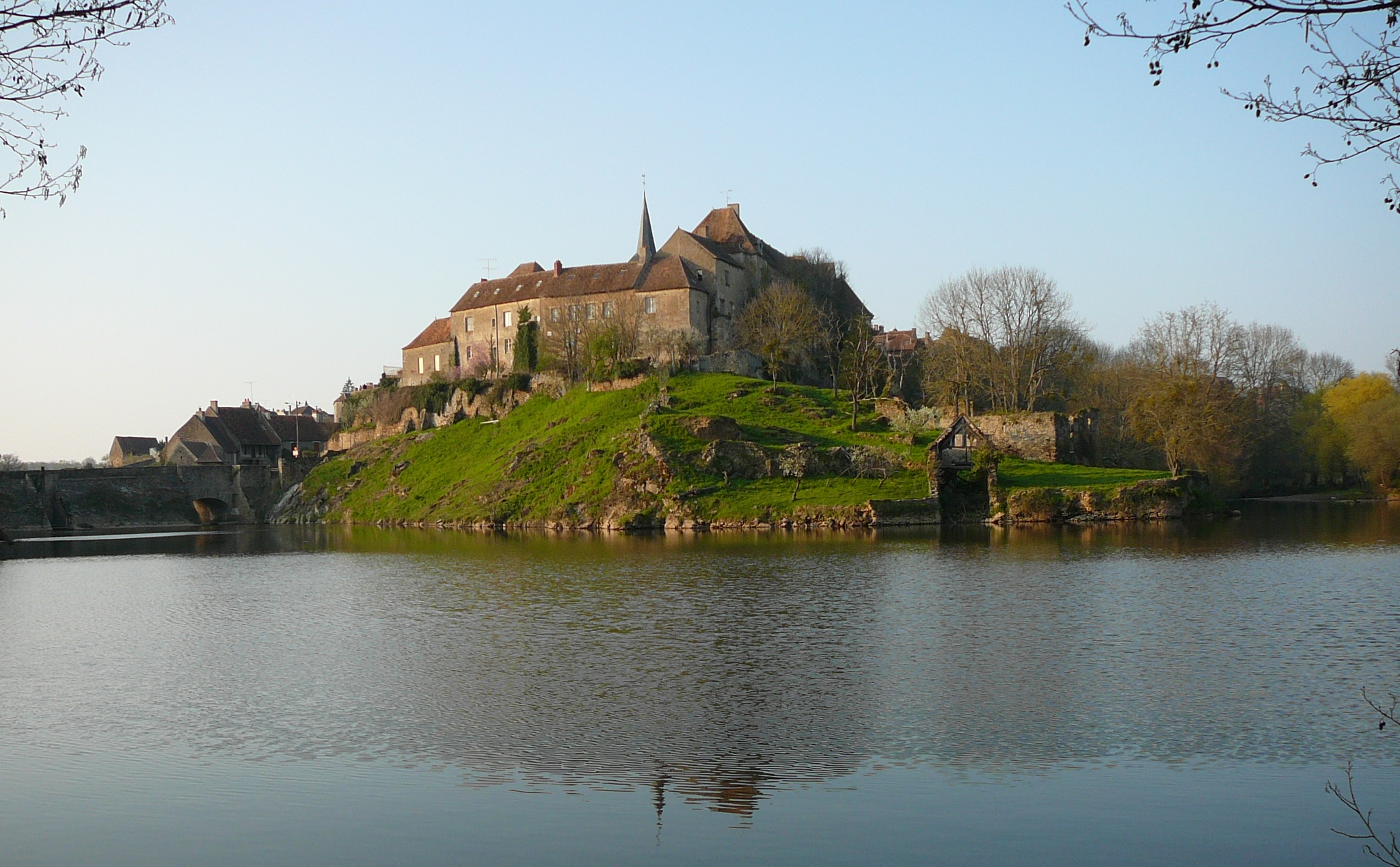
- The priory of Saint-Benoît

- Coat of arms
- Location of Saint-Benoît-du-Sault
- Location within France Location within Centre-Val de Loire
- Coordinates: 46°26′29″N 1°23′29″E
- Country: France
- Region: Centre-Val de Loire
- Department: Indre
- Arrondissement: Le Blanc
- Canton: Saint-Gaultier

Government
  - Mayor (2023–2026): Damien Barré
- Area^{1}: 1.8 km^{2} (0.69 sq mi)
- Elevation: 223 m (732 ft)
- Highest elevation: 246 m (807 ft)
- Lowest elevation: 175 m (574 ft)
- Population (2023): 510
  - Density: 280/km^{2} (730/sq mi)
- Time zone: UTC+01:00 (CET)
  - Summer (DST): UTC+02:00 (CEST)
- INSEE/Postal code: 36182 /36170
- ^{1} French Land Register data, which excludes lakes, ponds, glaciers > 1 km^{2} (0.386 sq mi or 247 acres) and river estuaries.

Saint-Benoît-du-Sault (French pronunciation: [sɛ̃ bənwa dy so]; Occitan: Sent Benet de Saul) is a commune in the Indre department in central France.

It is a medieval village, perched in a curve on a rocky butte overlooking the Portefeuille River in the former province of Berry. Since 1988, it has been a member of Les Plus Beaux Villages de France (The Most Beautiful Villages of France) Association.

== History ==
Located in the area of Gaul settled by a powerful Celtic tribe, the Bituriges, "Kings of the World" (summa penes imperii bituriges), powerful until their defeat against Julius Caesar at Bourges (Avaricum), part of Roman Aquitania.

Two dolmens (Passebonneau and des Gorces) near to Saint-Benoît-du-Sault attest to the ancientness of human presence, if not of the Bituriges. Ten centuries later, in 974, some benedictine monks of Sacierges-Saint-Martin took refuge on a granite spur, where they founded a priory: Salis, future Saint-Benoît-du-Sault. From the 10th to the 17th century, the history of the priory and the new village is made up of resistance to the possessive desires of feudal neighbours, such as the Limoges and de Brosse family. The town was surrounded by a double line of ramparts. The first, the most ancient, protected the priory, the church and the fort, the second established in the 15th century, encircled the commercial part. Its maze of narrow cobbled streets remains popular with sightseers.

== Population ==
Historical population
Year	Pop.	±% p.a.
1968	822	—
1975	864	+0.71%
1982	836	−0.47%
1990	856	+0.30%
1999	766	−1.23%
2007	710	−0.94%
2012	625	−2.52%
2017	602	−0.75%
2023	510	−2.73%
Source: INSEE

== Sights ==
Of architectural significance:

- Belfry.
- 14th-century portal.
- 14th-century Roman Priory. (Monuments Historiques)
- The medieval city in general.
- Castle of Brosse
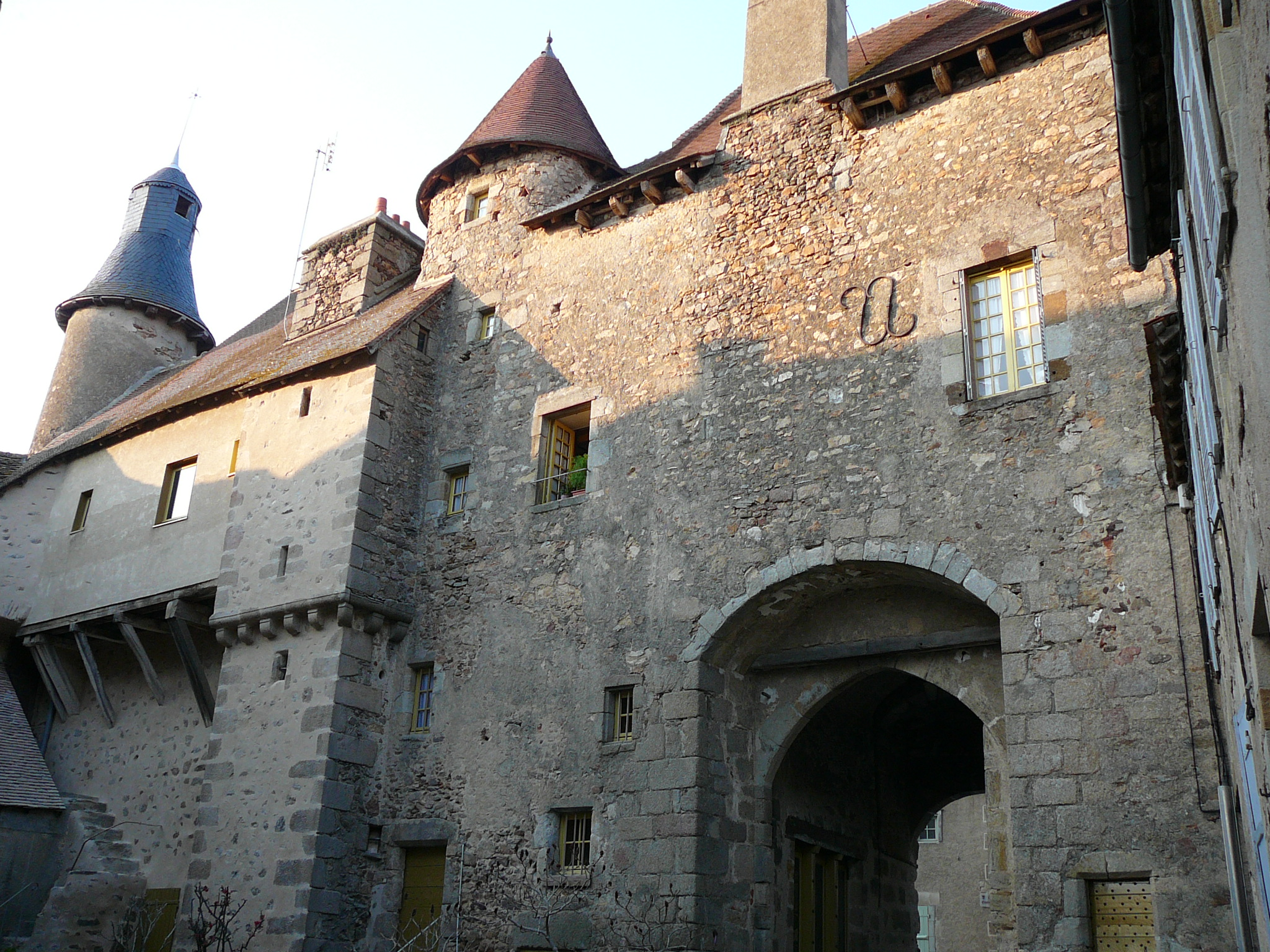
14th-century portal

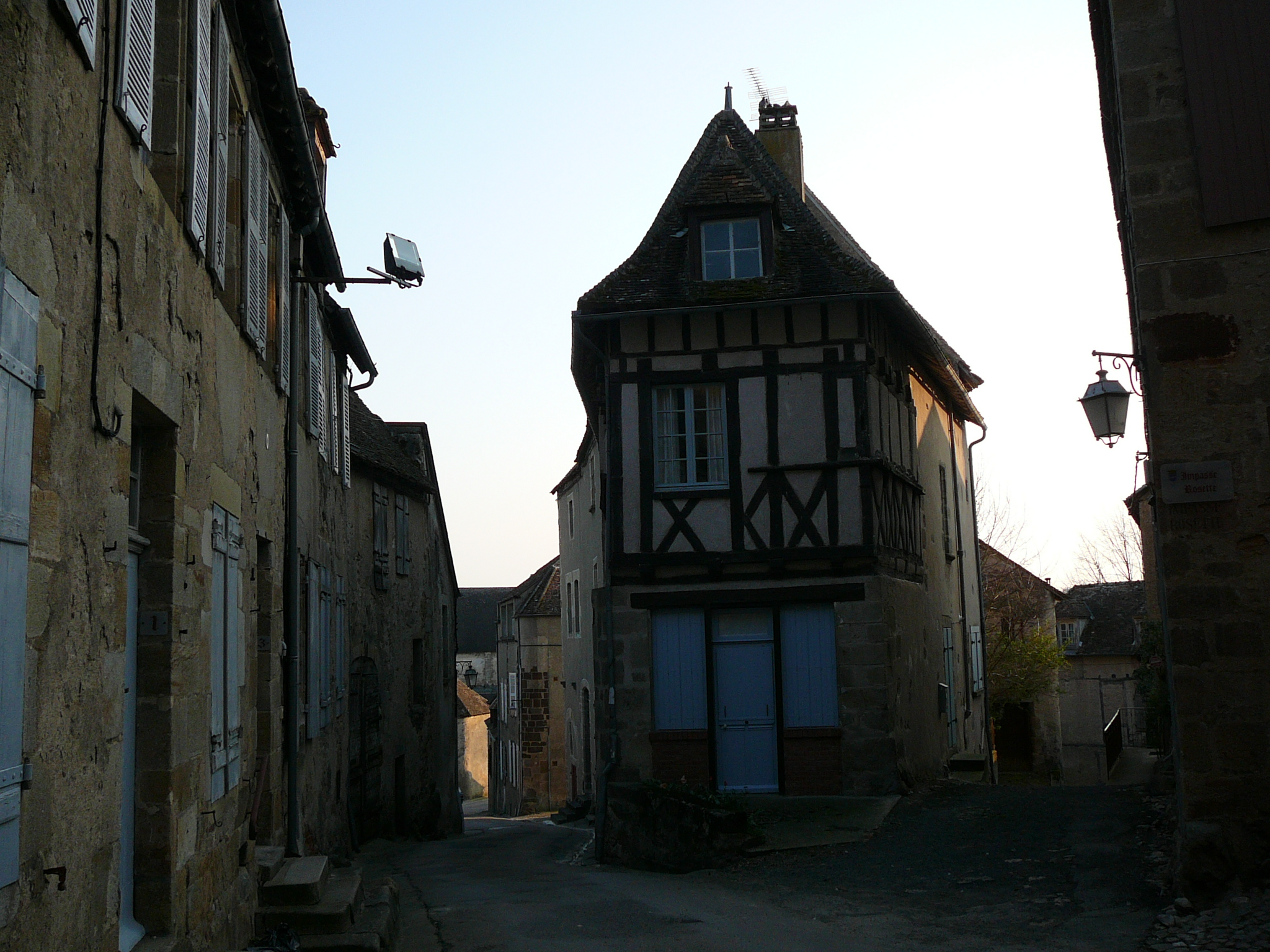
Medieval town

== Personalities ==
People associated with Saint-Benoît-du-Sault:

- Hervé Faye (1814–1902), astronomer
- François-Timoléon de Choisy (1644–1724), priest and author
- Herbert Southworth (1908–1999), historian

== See also ==
- Communes of the Indre department

== General bibliography ==
- Les origines de la vicomté de Brosse et de la prévôté de Saint Benoît du Sault, by Roland Aubert. Imprimerie Sodimass S.A Le Pont-Chrétien-Chabenet (Indre) 2005, ISBN 2-9525069-0-6
- Recherches archéologiques dans la région de Saint-Benoît du-Sault, by E. de Beaufort.
- Sur les Miracles de Saint-Benoît du Sault, by Adrevald, Adelaire, Aimoin and André (Monks of the Fleury abbay) 878–1050.
