= Saint-Gilles, Indre =

Saint-Gilles
- Commune
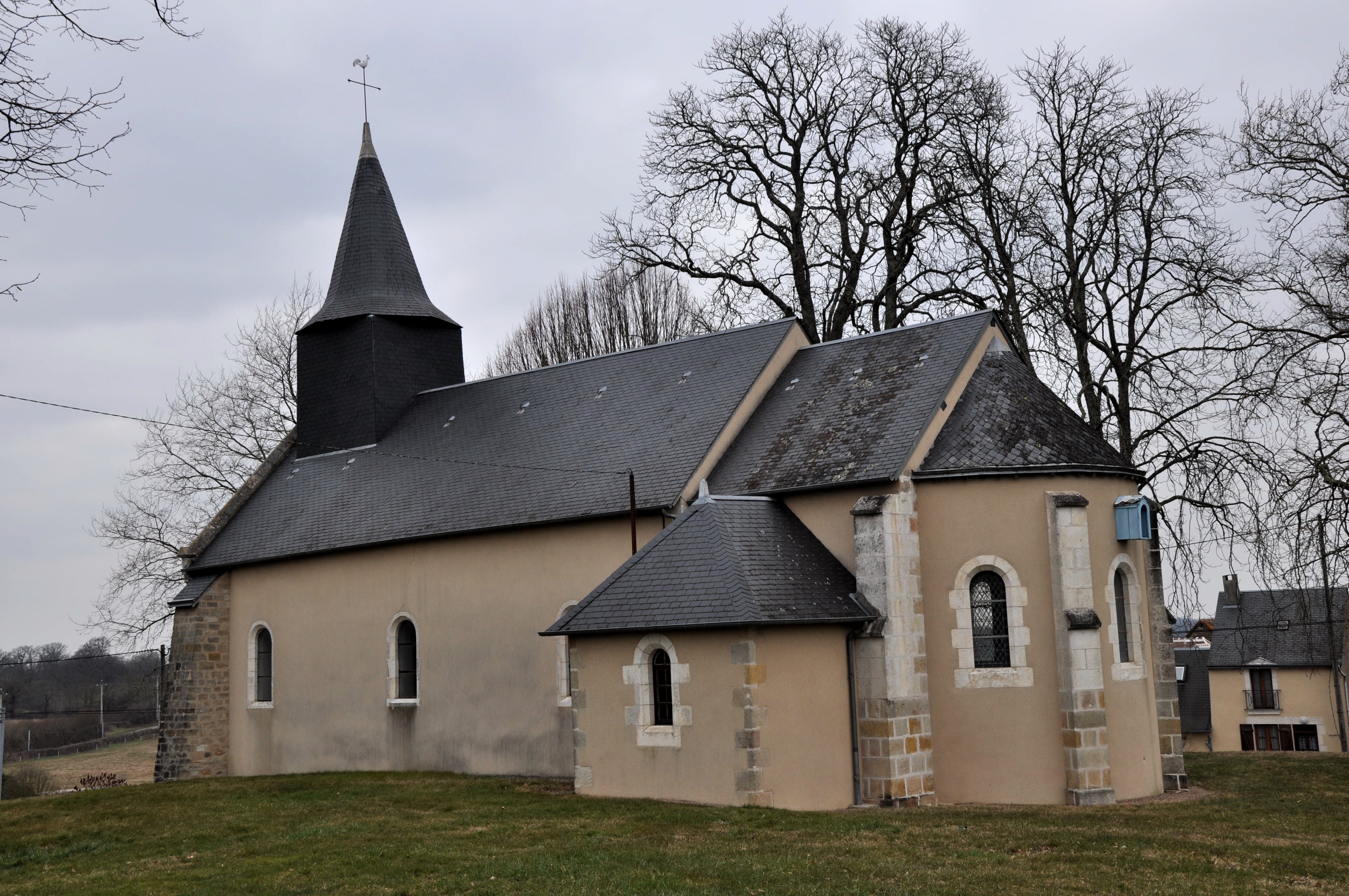
- The church in Saint-Gilles
- Location of Saint-Gilles
- Location within France Location within Centre-Val de Loire
- Coordinates: 46°29′45″N 1°26′44″E
- Country: France
- Region: Centre-Val de Loire
- Department: Indre
- Arrondissement: Le Blanc
- Canton: Saint-Gaultier

Government
  - Mayor (2020–2026): Spike Groën
- Area^{1}: 7.68 km^{2} (2.97 sq mi)
- Elevation: 210 m (690 ft)
- Highest elevation: 259 m (850 ft)
- Lowest elevation: 162 m (531 ft)
- Population (2023): 91
  - Density: 12/km^{2} (31/sq mi)
- Time zone: UTC+01:00 (CET)
  - Summer (DST): UTC+02:00 (CEST)
- INSEE/Postal code: 36196 /36170
- ^{1} French Land Register data, which excludes lakes, ponds, glaciers > 1 km^{2} (0.386 sq mi or 247 acres) and river estuaries.

Saint-Gilles (French pronunciation: [sɛ̃ ʒil]) is a commune in the Indre department in central France.

== Geography ==
The river Abloux forms most of the commune's eastern border.

== Population ==
Historical population
Year	Pop.	±% p.a.
1968	185	—
1975	185	+0.00%
1982	147	−3.23%
1990	135	−1.06%
1999	133	−0.17%
2007	92	−4.50%
2012	117	+4.93%
2017	110	−1.23%
2023	91	−3.11%
Source: INSEE

== See also ==
- Communes of the Indre department
