= Saint-Gaultier =

- Commune
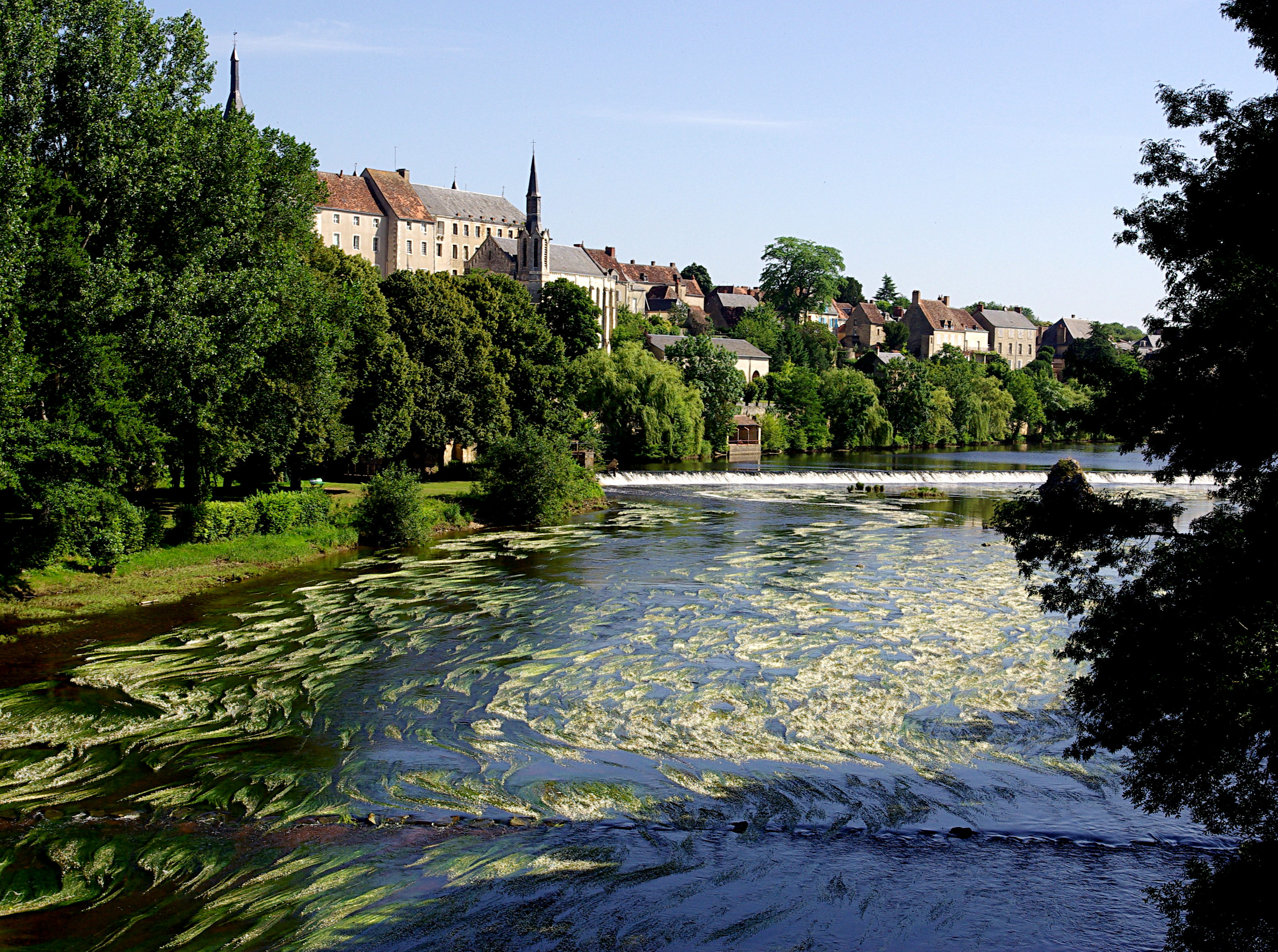
- The houses on the banks of the Creuse river

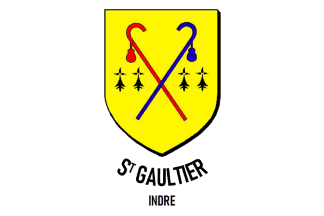
- Flag Coat of arms
- Location of Saint-Gaultier
- Location within France Location within Centre-Val de Loire
- Coordinates: 46°38′10″N 1°25′16″E
- Country: France
- Region: Centre-Val de Loire
- Department: Indre
- Arrondissement: Le Blanc
- Canton: Saint-Gaultier
- Intercommunality: Éguzon-Argenton-Vallée de la Creuse

Government
  - Mayor (2020–2026): Bruno Chartier
- Area^{1}: 9.20 km^{2} (3.55 sq mi)
- Elevation: 113 m (371 ft)
- Highest elevation: 169 m (554 ft)
- Lowest elevation: 91 m (299 ft)
- Population (2023): 1,701
  - Density: 185/km^{2} (479/sq mi)
- Time zone: UTC+01:00 (CET)
  - Summer (DST): UTC+02:00 (CEST)
- INSEE/Postal code: 36192 /36800
- ^{1} French Land Register data, which excludes lakes, ponds, glaciers > 1 km^{2} (0.386 sq mi or 247 acres) and river estuaries.

Saint-Gaultier (French pronunciation: [sɛ̃ gotje]) is a commune in the Indre department in central France.

== Geography ==
The commune is located in the parc naturel régional de la Brenne.

== Population ==
Historical population
Year	Pop.	±% p.a.
1968	2,235	—
1975	2,174	−0.39%
1982	2,042	−0.89%
1990	1,995	−0.29%
1999	1,934	−0.34%
2007	1,932	−0.01%
2012	1,853	−0.83%
2017	1,833	−0.22%
2023	1,701	−1.24%
Source: INSEE

== See also ==
- Communes of the Indre department
