= Saint-Civran =

- Commune
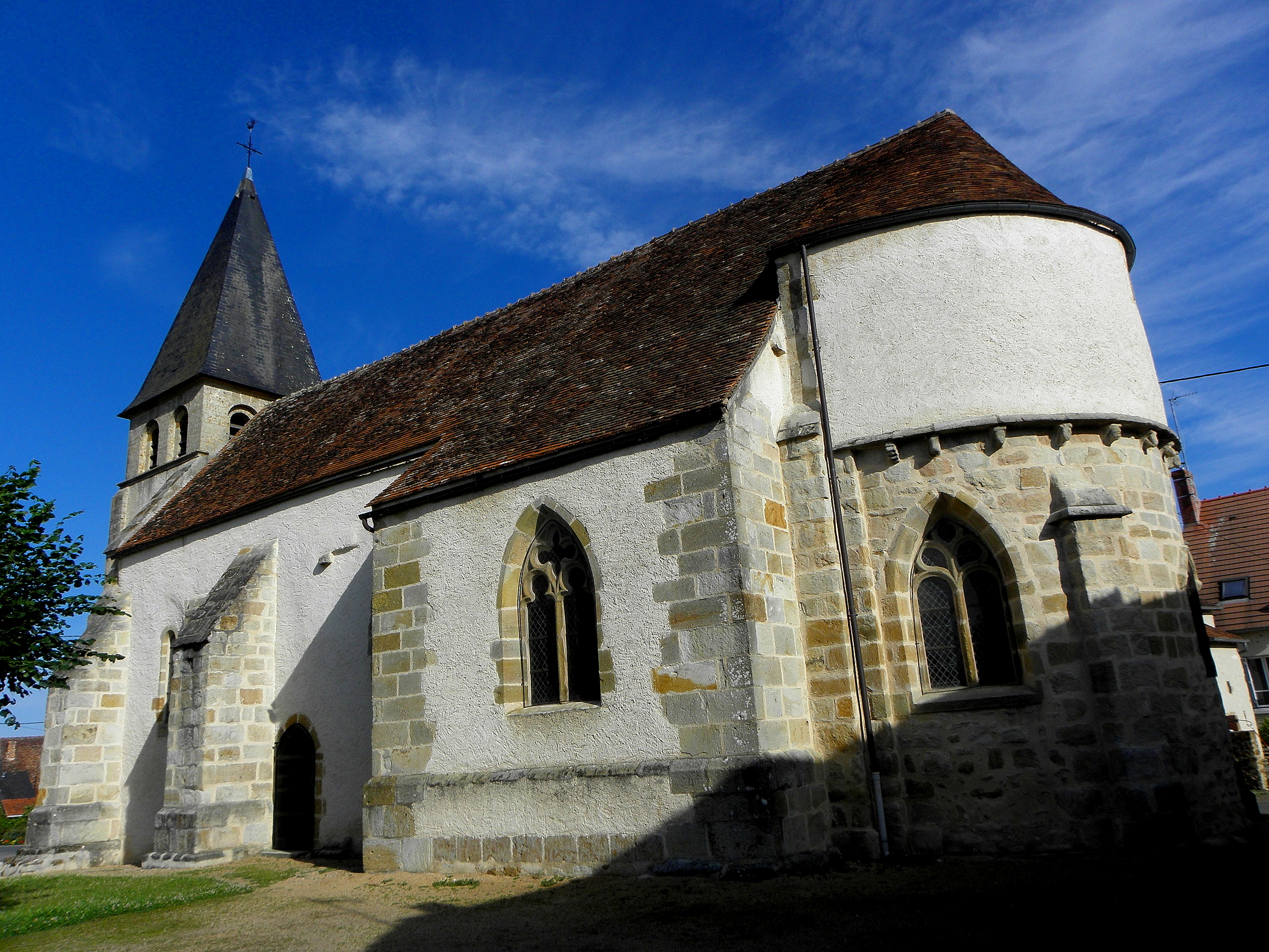
- The church of Saint-Cyprien, in Saint-Civran
- Location of Saint-Civran
- Location within France Location within Centre-Val de Loire
- Coordinates: 46°29′51″N 1°23′26″E
- Country: France
- Region: Centre-Val de Loire
- Department: Indre
- Arrondissement: Le Blanc
- Canton: Saint-Gaultier
- Intercommunality: Brenne Val de Creuse

Government
  - Mayor (2020–2026): Philippe Guérin
- Area^{1}: 11.61 km^{2} (4.48 sq mi)
- Elevation: 220 m (720 ft)
- Highest elevation: 241 m (791 ft)
- Lowest elevation: 133 m (436 ft)
- Population (2023): 137
  - Density: 11.8/km^{2} (30.6/sq mi)
- Time zone: UTC+01:00 (CET)
  - Summer (DST): UTC+02:00 (CEST)
- INSEE/Postal code: 36187 /36170
- ^{1} French Land Register data, which excludes lakes, ponds, glaciers > 1 km^{2} (0.386 sq mi or 247 acres) and river estuaries.

Saint-Civran (French pronunciation: [sɛ̃ sivʁɑ̃]; Occitan: Sent Cibran; ultimately from Saint Cyprian) is a commune in the Indre department in central France.

== Geography ==
The river Abloux flows west through the northern part of the commune.

== Population ==
Historical population
Year	Pop.	±% p.a.
1968	275	—
1975	229	−2.58%
1982	193	−2.41%
1990	158	−2.47%
1999	154	−0.28%
2007	177	+1.76%
2012	176	−0.11%
2017	140	−4.47%
2023	137	−0.36%
Source: INSEE

== See also ==
- Communes of the Indre department
