= Chazelet =

- Commune
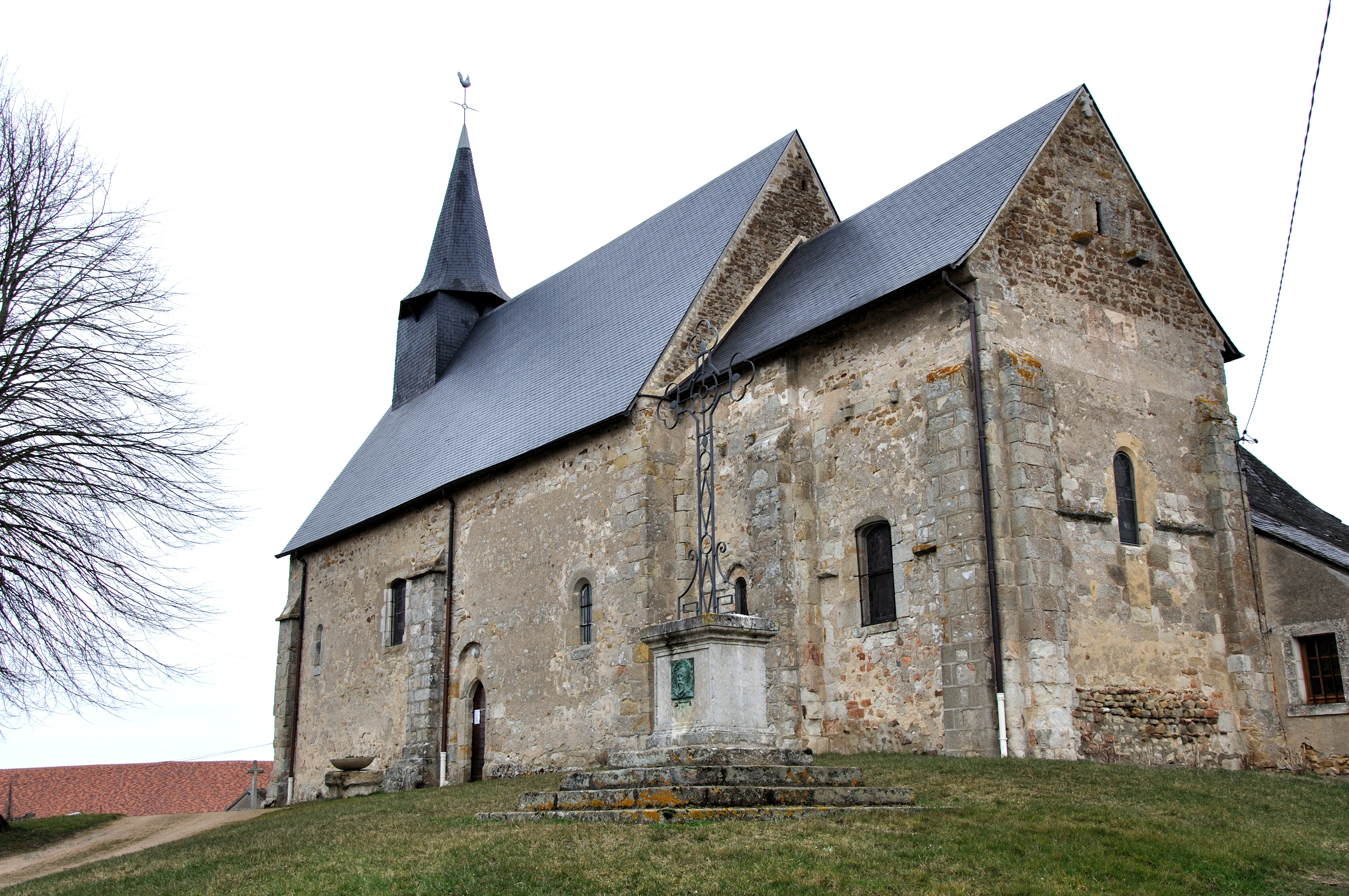
- The Church of Saint-Jean-Baptiste, in Chazelet
- Location of Chazelet
- Location within France Location within Centre-Val de Loire
- Coordinates: 46°30′33″N 1°26′34″E
- Country: France
- Region: Centre-Val de Loire
- Department: Indre
- Arrondissement: Le Blanc
- Canton: Saint-Gaultier
- Intercommunality: Brenne Val de Creuse

Government
  - Mayor (2020–2026): Dominique Delaigue-Billaud
- Area^{1}: 11.73 km^{2} (4.53 sq mi)
- Elevation: 215 m (705 ft)
- Highest elevation: 237 m (778 ft)
- Lowest elevation: 141 m (463 ft)
- Population (2023): 124
  - Density: 10.6/km^{2} (27.4/sq mi)
- Time zone: UTC+01:00 (CET)
  - Summer (DST): UTC+02:00 (CEST)
- INSEE/Postal code: 36049 /36170
- ^{1} French Land Register data, which excludes lakes, ponds, glaciers > 1 km^{2} (0.386 sq mi or 247 acres) and river estuaries.

Chazelet (French pronunciation: [ʃazlɛ]) is a commune in the Indre department in central France.

== Geography ==
The commune is located in the parc naturel régional de la Brenne.

The river Abloux flows west through the southern part of the commune.

== Population ==
Historical population
Year	Pop.	±% p.a.
1968	189	—
1975	196	+0.52%
1982	150	−3.75%
1990	132	−1.59%
1999	146	+1.13%
2007	122	−2.22%
2012	118	−0.66%
2017	122	+0.67%
2023	124	+0.27%
Source: INSEE

== See also ==
- Communes of the Indre department
