= Bonneuil, Indre =

Bonneuil
- Commune
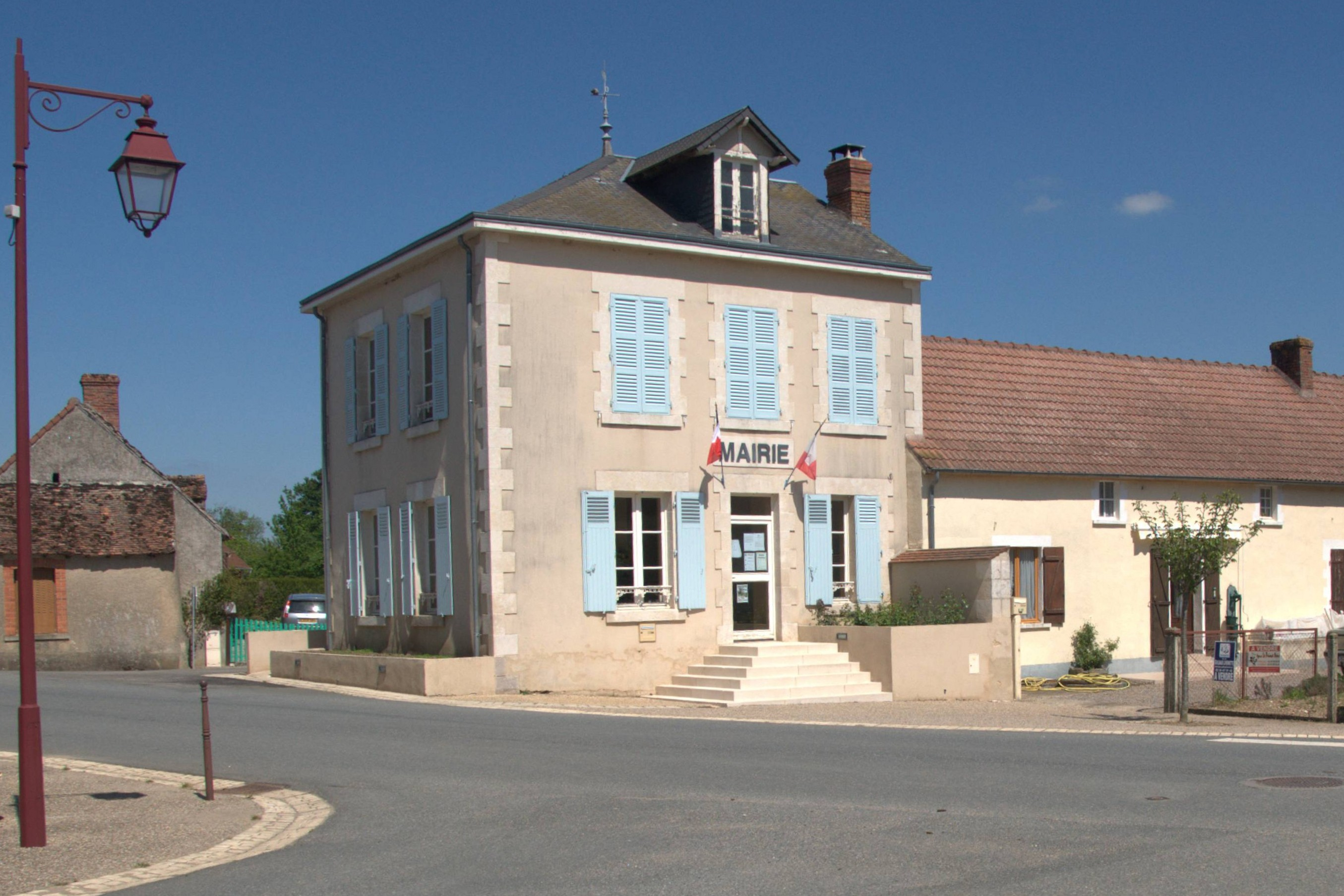
- The town hall in Bonneuil
- Location of Bonneuil
- Location within France Location within Centre-Val de Loire
- Coordinates: 46°22′30″N 1°13′37″E
- Country: France
- Region: Centre-Val de Loire
- Department: Indre
- Arrondissement: Le Blanc
- Canton: Saint-Gaultier

Government
  - Mayor (2023–2026): Robert Diez-Pommares
- Area^{1}: 11.41 km^{2} (4.41 sq mi)
- Elevation: 210 m (690 ft)
- Highest elevation: 234 m (768 ft)
- Lowest elevation: 160 m (520 ft)
- Population (2023): 74
  - Density: 6.5/km^{2} (17/sq mi)
- Time zone: UTC+01:00 (CET)
  - Summer (DST): UTC+02:00 (CEST)
- INSEE/Postal code: 36020 /36310
- ^{1} French Land Register data, which excludes lakes, ponds, glaciers > 1 km^{2} (0.386 sq mi or 247 acres) and river estuaries.

Bonneuil (French pronunciation: [bɔnœj]) is a commune in the Indre department in central France. The small village contains a manor house built in the 15th century called La Fortilesse, where Jean-Baptiste Rougier de la Bergerie, a Baron of Napoleon's empire, was born, on 4 September 1757. He authored a number of books on agriculture. Today the building is privately owned and has been for sale for a couple of years.

== Geography ==
The river Benaize forms most of the commune's southern border.

== Population ==
Historical population
Year	Pop.	±% p.a.
1968	201	—
1975	176	−1.88%
1982	173	−0.25%
1990	101	−6.51%
1999	83	−2.16%
2007	88	+0.73%
2012	106	+3.79%
2017	79	−5.71%
2023	74	−1.08%
Source: INSEE

== See also ==
- Communes of the Indre department
