= Mouhet =

- Commune
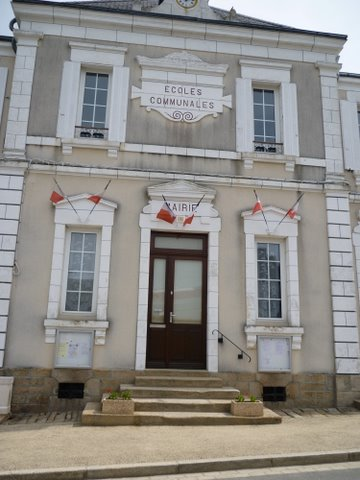
- The town hall in Mouhet
- Location of Mouhet
- Location within France Location within Centre-Val de Loire
- Coordinates: 46°23′02″N 1°26′03″E
- Country: France
- Region: Centre-Val de Loire
- Department: Indre
- Arrondissement: Le Blanc
- Canton: Saint-Gaultier

Government
  - Mayor (2020–2026): Jean-Christophe Plantureux
- Area^{1}: 32.26 km^{2} (12.46 sq mi)
- Elevation: 260 m (850 ft)
- Highest elevation: 344 m (1,129 ft)
- Lowest elevation: 237 m (778 ft)
- Population (2023): 418
  - Density: 13.0/km^{2} (33.6/sq mi)
- Time zone: UTC+01:00 (CET)
  - Summer (DST): UTC+02:00 (CEST)
- INSEE/Postal code: 36134 /36170
- ^{1} French Land Register data, which excludes lakes, ponds, glaciers > 1 km^{2} (0.386 sq mi or 247 acres) and river estuaries.

Mouhet (French pronunciation: [mu.ɛ]) is a commune in the Indre department in central France.

== Geography ==
The Anglin flows northwest through the middle of the commune and crosses the village.

== Population ==
Historical population
Year	Pop.	±% p.a.
1968	827	—
1975	777	−0.89%
1982	645	−2.62%
1990	528	−2.47%
1999	478	−1.10%
2007	504	+0.66%
2012	512	+0.32%
2017	414	−4.16%
2023	418	+0.16%
Source: INSEE

== See also ==
- Communes of the Indre department
