= Roussines, Indre =

Roussines
- Commune
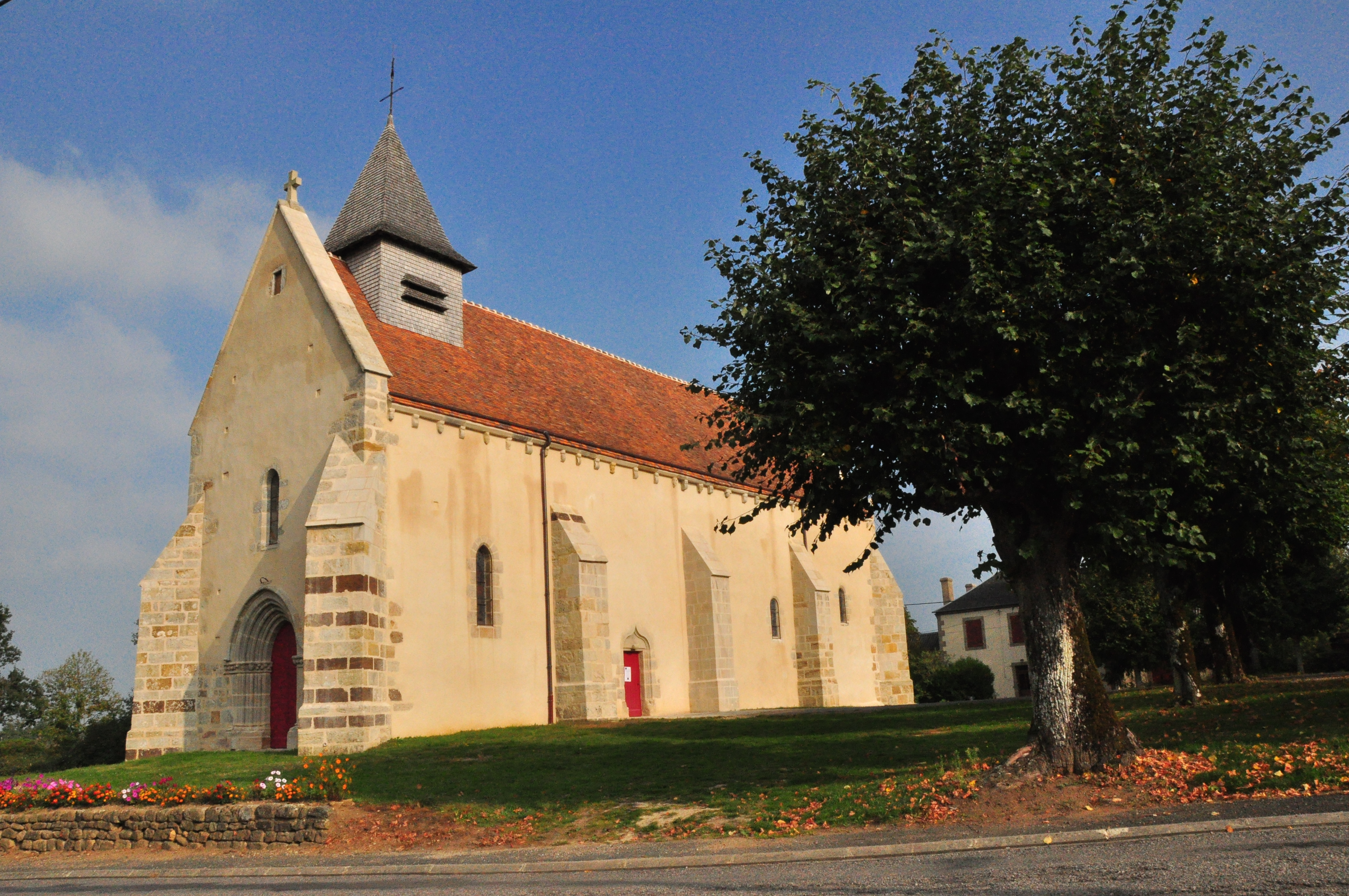
- The Church of Saint-Sulpice, in Roussines
- Location of Roussines
- Location within France Location within Centre-Val de Loire
- Coordinates: 46°28′10″N 1°23′25″E
- Country: France
- Region: Centre-Val de Loire
- Department: Indre
- Arrondissement: Le Blanc
- Canton: Saint-Gaultier

Government
  - Mayor (2020–2026): Philippe Gourlay
- Area^{1}: 22.98 km^{2} (8.87 sq mi)
- Elevation: 220 m (720 ft)
- Highest elevation: 246 m (807 ft)
- Lowest elevation: 135 m (443 ft)
- Population (2023): 355
  - Density: 15.4/km^{2} (40.0/sq mi)
- Time zone: UTC+01:00 (CET)
  - Summer (DST): UTC+02:00 (CEST)
- INSEE/Postal code: 36174 /36170
- ^{1} French Land Register data, which excludes lakes, ponds, glaciers > 1 km^{2} (0.386 sq mi or 247 acres) and river estuaries.

Roussines (French pronunciation: [ʁusin]) is a commune in the Indre department in central France.

== Population ==
Historical population
Year	Pop.	±% p.a.
1968	525	—
1975	489	−1.01%
1982	487	−0.06%
1990	450	−0.98%
1999	393	−1.49%
2007	386	−0.22%
2012	350	−1.94%
2017	360	+0.57%
2023	355	−0.23%
Source: INSEE

== See also ==
- Communes of the Indre department
