= Beaulieu, Indre =

Beaulieu
- Commune
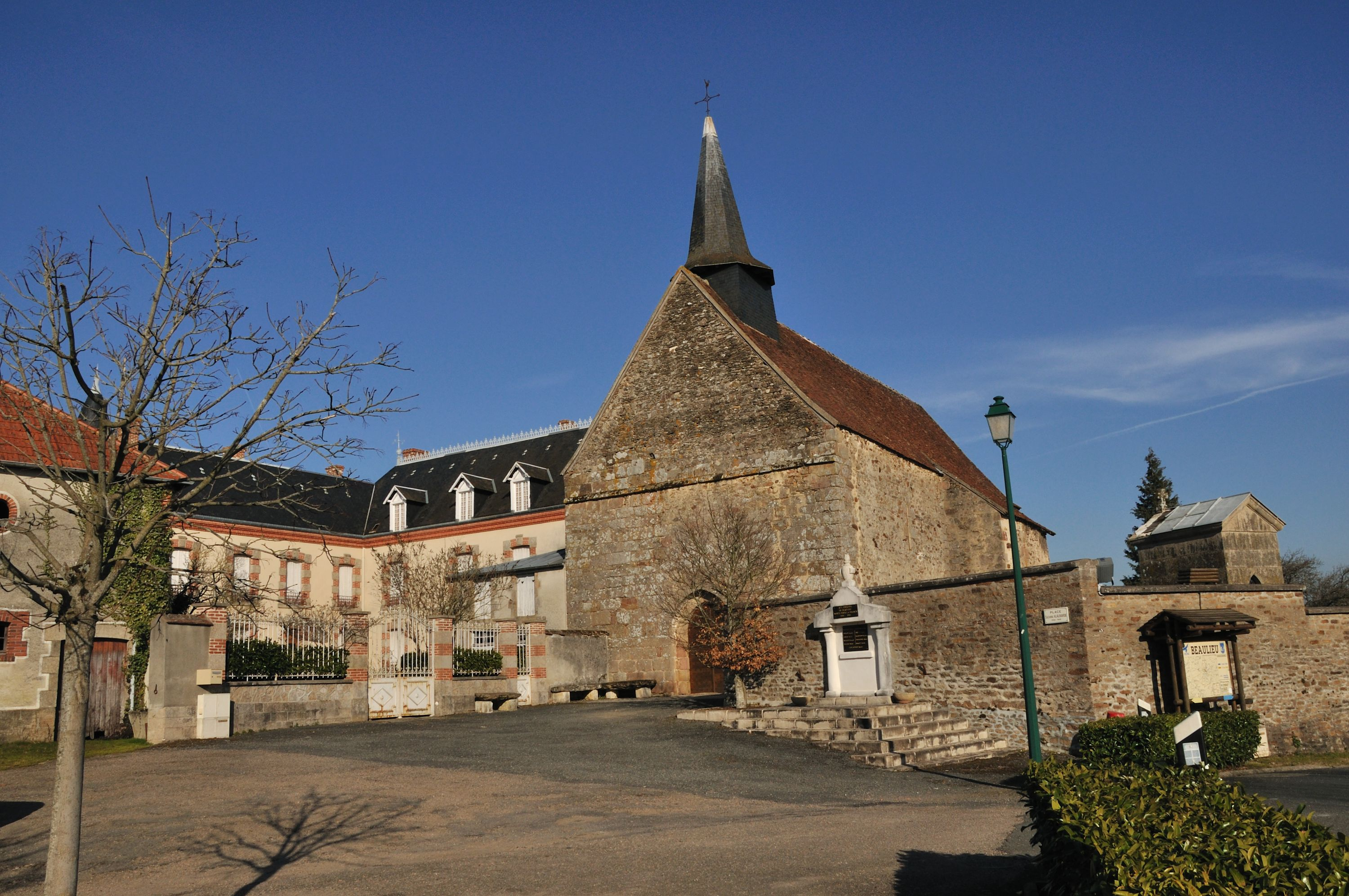
- The church of Saint-Nicolas, in Beaulieu
- Location of Beaulieu
- Location within France Location within Centre-Val de Loire
- Coordinates: 46°23′14″N 1°18′29″E
- Country: France
- Region: Centre-Val de Loire
- Department: Indre
- Arrondissement: Le Blanc
- Canton: Saint-Gaultier

Government
  - Mayor (2020–2026): Alain Ovan
- Area^{1}: 7.48 km^{2} (2.89 sq mi)
- Elevation: 226 m (741 ft)
- Highest elevation: 237 m (778 ft)
- Lowest elevation: 187 m (614 ft)
- Population (2023): 51
  - Density: 6.8/km^{2} (18/sq mi)
- Time zone: UTC+01:00 (CET)
  - Summer (DST): UTC+02:00 (CEST)
- INSEE/Postal code: 36015 /36310
- ^{1} French Land Register data, which excludes lakes, ponds, glaciers > 1 km^{2} (0.386 sq mi or 247 acres) and river estuaries.

Beaulieu (French pronunciation: [boljø]) is a commune in the Indre department in central France.

== Population ==
Historical population
Year	Pop.	±% p.a.
1968	180	—
1975	155	−2.11%
1982	167	+1.07%
1990	101	−6.09%
1999	95	−0.68%
2007	86	−1.24%
2012	76	−2.44%
2017	55	−6.26%
2023	51	−1.25%
Source: INSEE

== See also ==
- Communes of the Indre department
