= La Châtre-Langlin =

- Commune
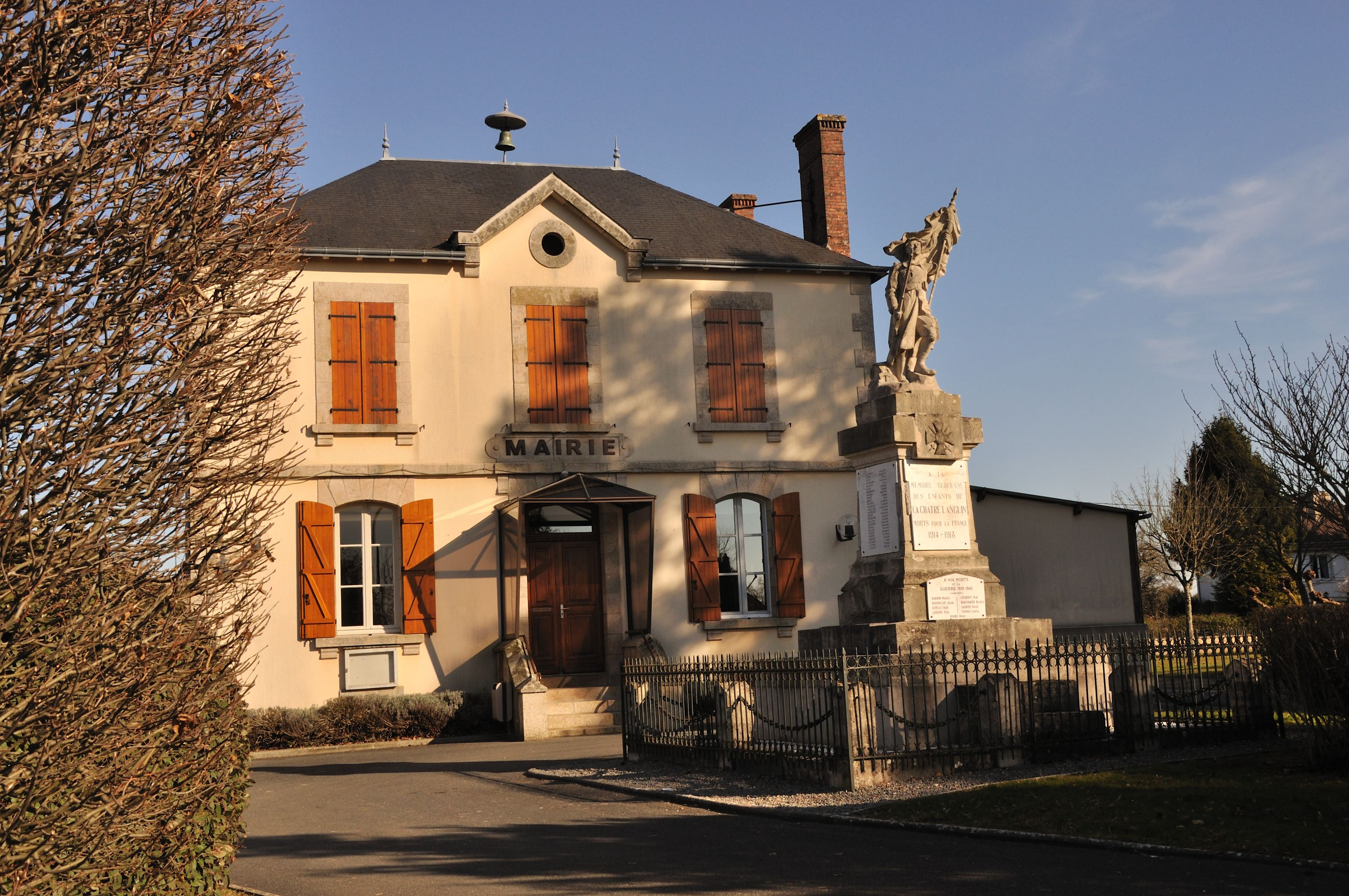
- Town hall
- Location of La Châtre-Langlin
- Location within France Location within Centre-Val de Loire
- Coordinates: 46°24′33″N 1°23′24″E
- Country: France
- Region: Centre-Val de Loire
- Department: Indre
- Arrondissement: Le Blanc
- Canton: Saint-Gaultier

Government
  - Mayor (2020–2026): Marcel Bourgoin
- Area^{1}: 27.4 km^{2} (10.6 sq mi)
- Elevation: 304 m (997 ft)
- Highest elevation: 302 m (991 ft)
- Lowest elevation: 173 m (568 ft)
- Population (2023): 509
  - Density: 18.6/km^{2} (48.1/sq mi)
- Time zone: UTC+01:00 (CET)
  - Summer (DST): UTC+02:00 (CEST)
- INSEE/Postal code: 36047 /36170
- ^{1} French Land Register data, which excludes lakes, ponds, glaciers > 1 km^{2} (0.386 sq mi or 247 acres) and river estuaries.

La Châtre-Langlin (French pronunciation: [la ʃatʁ lɑ̃ɡlɛ̃]) is a commune in the Indre department in central France.

== Geography ==
The Anglin flows northwest through the middle of the commune.

== Population ==
Historical population
| Year | Pop. | ±% p.a. |
|---|---|---|
| 1968 | 778 | — |
| 1975 | 716 | −1.18% |
| 1982 | 679 | −0.76% |
| 1990 | 628 | −0.97% |
| 1999 | 564 | −1.19% |
| 2007 | 573 | +0.20% |
| 2012 | 555 | −0.64% |
| 2017 | 521 | −1.26% |
| 2023 | 509 | −0.39% |
Source: INSEE

== See also ==
- Communes of the Indre department
