= Anglin =

River in France

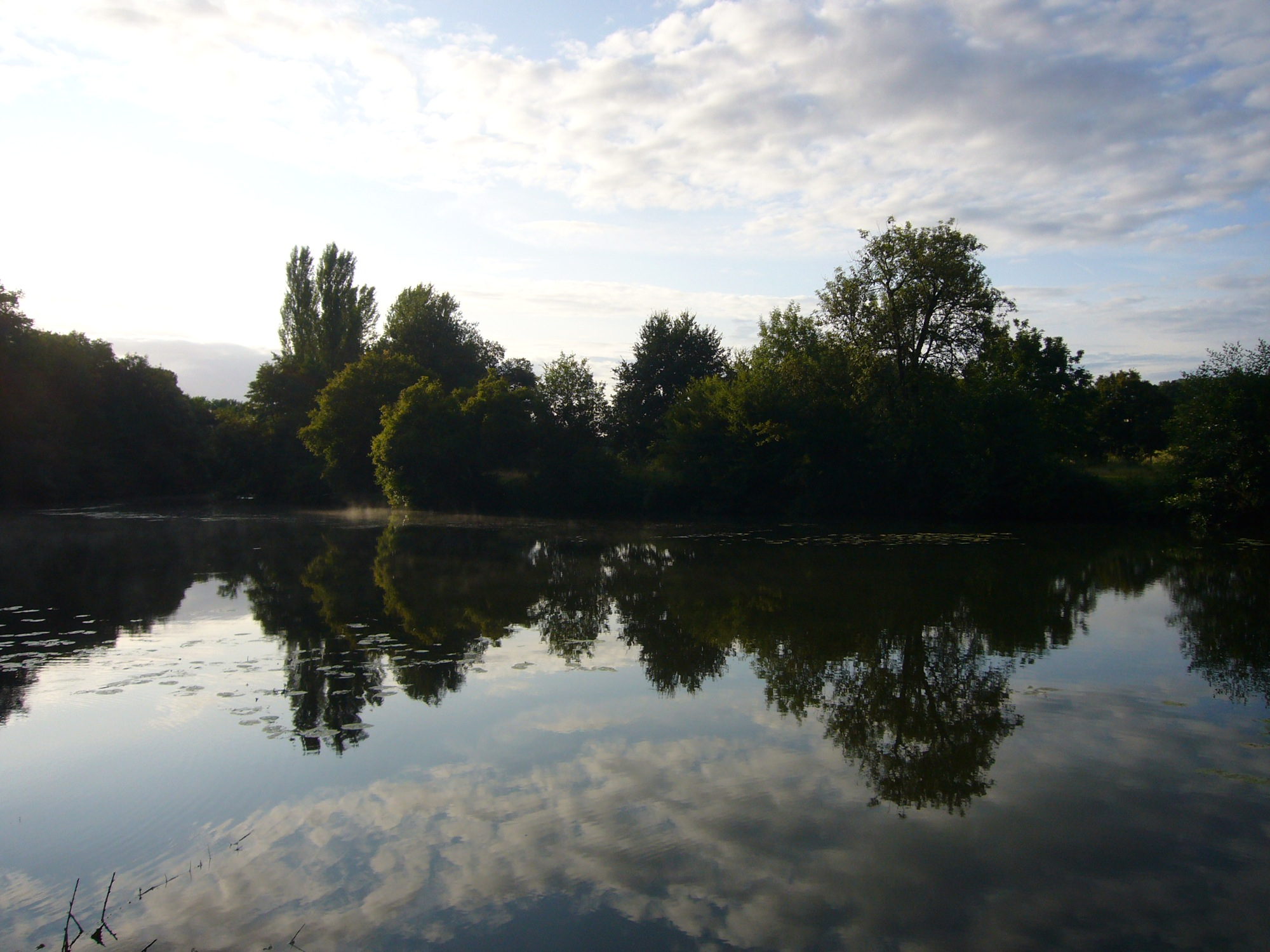
- The Anglin

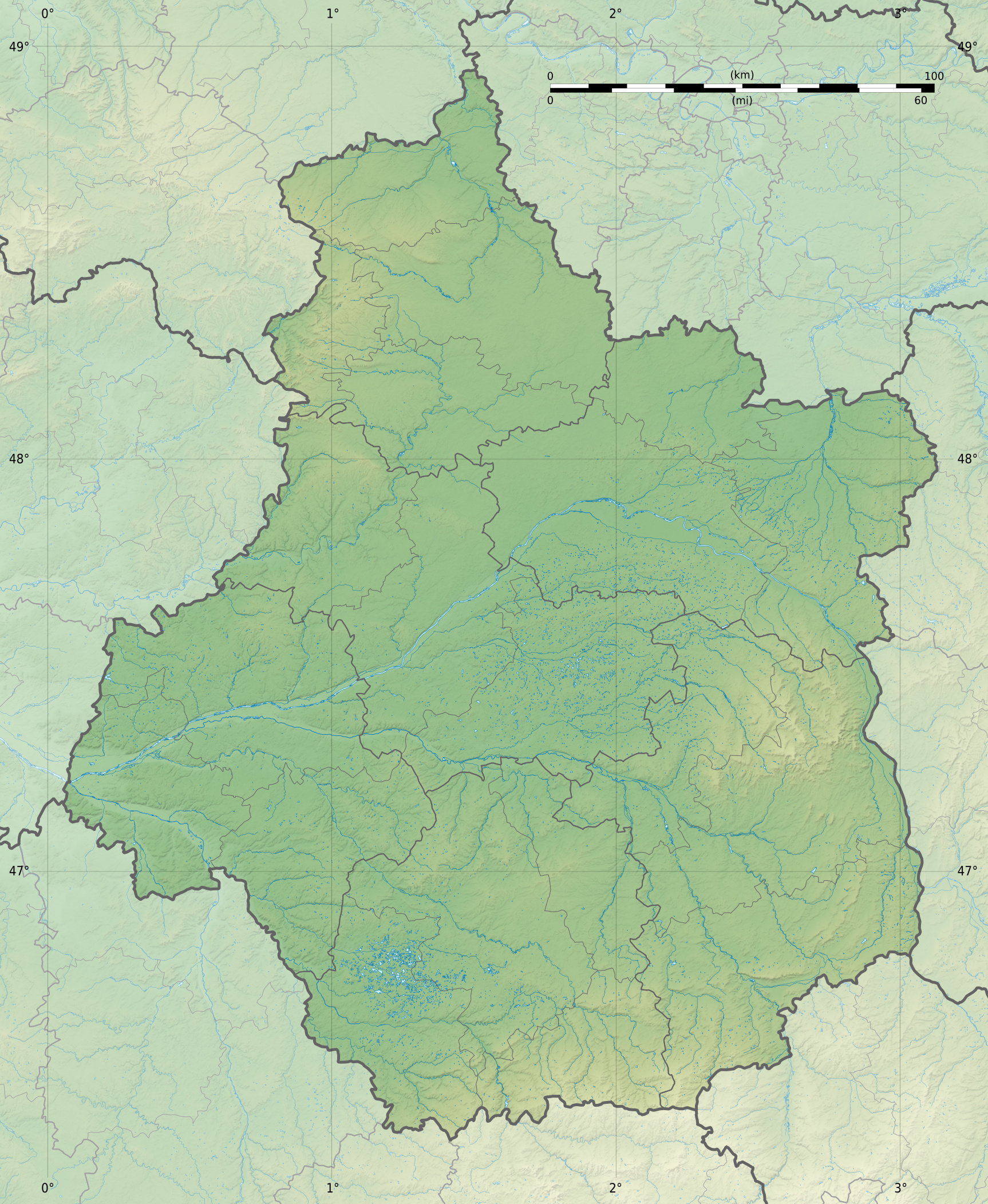
- Location within France Location within Centre-Val de Loire

Location
- Country: France

Physical characteristics
- Source
  - location: near Azerables
  - coordinates: 46°21′30″N 01°27′57″E
  - elevation: 300 m (980 ft)
- Mouth
  - location: Gartempe
  - coordinates: 46°42′15″N 00°51′57″E
  - elevation: 62 m (203 ft)
- Length: 91.3 km (56.7 mi)
- Basin size: 1,660 km^{2} (640 sq mi)
- Discharge
  - average: 12.5 m^{3}/s (440 cu ft/s)

Basin features
- Progression: Gartempe→ Creuse→ Vienne→ Loire→ Atlantic Ocean

The Anglin (French pronunciation: [ɑ̃ɡlɛ̃]) is a 91.3 km (56.7 mi) long river in the Creuse, Indre and Vienne departments in central France. Its source is near Azerables. It flows generally northwest. It is a right tributary of the Gartempe, into which it flows near Angles-sur-l'Anglin.

Its main tributaries are the Salleron, the Abloux and the Benaize.

The Anglin is one of France's few remaining "wild rivers" (rivers which have never been dammed). Anglin Castle is an 11th Century castle located high above the banks of the Anglin in the town of Angles-sur-l'Anglin.

== Departments and communes along its course ==
The following list is ordered from source to mouth :

- Creuse: Azerables
- Indre: Mouhet, La Châtre-Langlin, Chaillac, Dunet, Lignac, Chalais, Bélâbre, Mauvières, Saint-Hilaire-sur-Benaize, Concremiers, Ingrandes, Mérigny
- Vienne: Saint-Pierre-de-Maillé, Angles-sur-l'Anglin
