= Parnac, Indre =

Parnac
- Commune
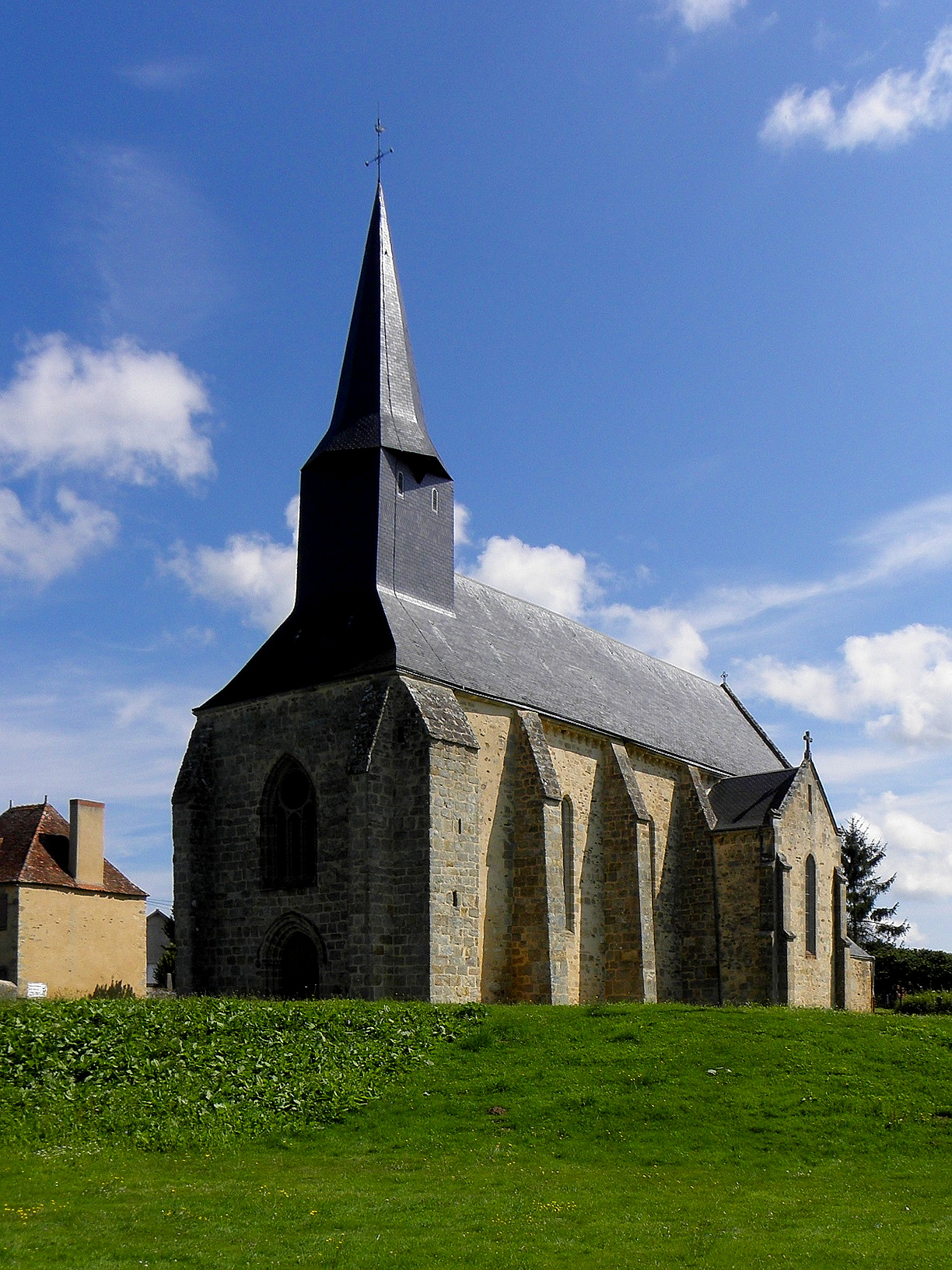
- The church of Saint-Martin, in Parnac

- Coat of arms
- Location of Parnac
- Location within France Location within Centre-Val de Loire
- Coordinates: 46°27′15″N 1°26′35″E
- Country: France
- Region: Centre-Val de Loire
- Department: Indre
- Arrondissement: Le Blanc
- Canton: Saint-Gaultier
- Intercommunality: CC Marche Occitane - Val d'Anglin

Government
  - Mayor (2020–2026): Christine Dejoie
- Area^{1}: 46.75 km^{2} (18.05 sq mi)
- Elevation: 244 m (801 ft)
- Highest elevation: 317 m (1,040 ft)
- Lowest elevation: 182 m (597 ft)
- Population (2023): 509
  - Density: 10.9/km^{2} (28.2/sq mi)
- Time zone: UTC+01:00 (CET)
  - Summer (DST): UTC+02:00 (CEST)
- INSEE/Postal code: 36150 /36170
- ^{1} French Land Register data, which excludes lakes, ponds, glaciers > 1 km^{2} (0.386 sq mi or 247 acres) and river estuaries.

Parnac (French pronunciation: [paʁnak]) is a commune in the Indre department in central France.

== Geography ==
The river Abloux forms all of the commune's northeastern border.

== Population ==
Historical population
Year	Pop.	±% p.a.
1968	911	—
1975	769	−2.39%
1982	706	−1.21%
1990	650	−1.03%
1999	562	−1.60%
2007	529	−0.75%
2012	522	−0.27%
2017	501	−0.82%
2023	509	+0.26%
Source: INSEE

== See also ==
- Communes of the Indre department
