= Vigoux =

- Commune
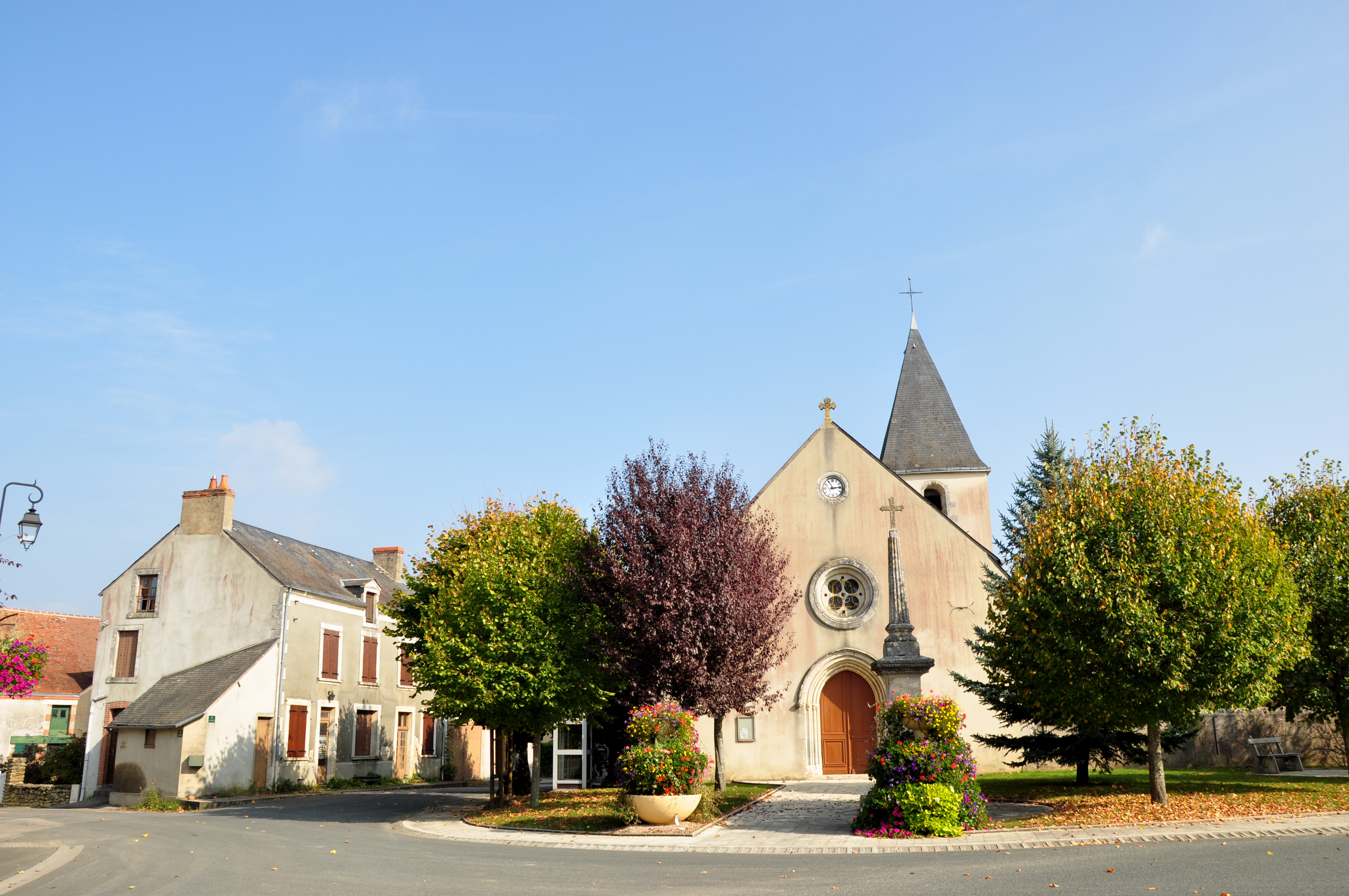
- The church in Vigoux
- Location of Vigoux
- Location within France Location within Centre-Val de Loire
- Coordinates: 46°30′40″N 1°29′18″E
- Country: France
- Region: Centre-Val de Loire
- Department: Indre
- Arrondissement: Le Blanc
- Canton: Saint-Gaultier
- Intercommunality: Brenne Val de Creuse

Government
  - Mayor (2021–2026): Brigitte Beigneux-Pipereau
- Area^{1}: 37.51 km^{2} (14.48 sq mi)
- Elevation: 211 m (692 ft)
- Highest elevation: 269 m (883 ft)
- Lowest elevation: 168 m (551 ft)
- Population (2023): 472
  - Density: 12.6/km^{2} (32.6/sq mi)
- Time zone: UTC+01:00 (CET)
  - Summer (DST): UTC+02:00 (CEST)
- INSEE/Postal code: 36239 /36170
- ^{1} French Land Register data, which excludes lakes, ponds, glaciers > 1 km^{2} (0.386 sq mi or 247 acres) and river estuaries.

Vigoux (French pronunciation: [viɡu]) is a commune in the Indre department in central France.

== Geography ==
The river Abloux forms all of the commune's southwestern border.

== Population ==
Historical population
Year	Pop.	±% p.a.
1968	534	—
1975	439	−2.76%
1982	376	−2.19%
1990	399	+0.74%
1999	445	+1.22%
2007	464	+0.52%
2012	460	−0.17%
2017	461	+0.04%
2023	472	+0.39%
Source: INSEE

== See also ==
- Communes of the Indre department
