= Dunet =

- Commune
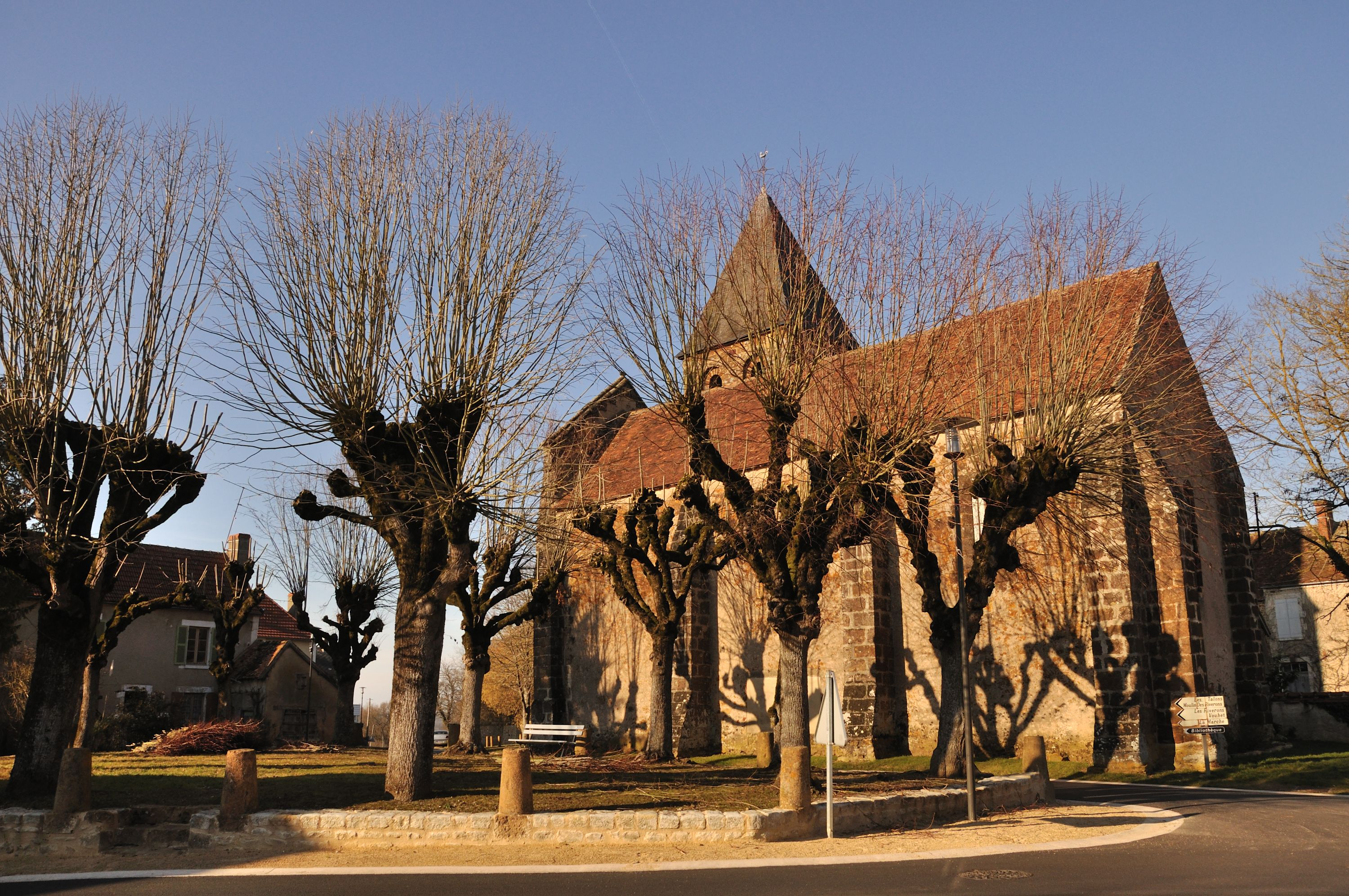
- The Church of Saint-Martial, in Dunet
- Location of Dunet
- Location within France Location within Centre-Val de Loire
- Coordinates: 46°28′08″N 1°17′32″E
- Country: France
- Region: Centre-Val de Loire
- Department: Indre
- Arrondissement: Le Blanc
- Canton: Saint-Gaultier

Government
  - Mayor (2020–2026): Nathalie Laurencier
- Area^{1}: 9.24 km^{2} (3.57 sq mi)
- Elevation: 164 m (538 ft)
- Highest elevation: 199 m (653 ft)
- Lowest elevation: 112 m (367 ft)
- Population (2023): 103
  - Density: 11.1/km^{2} (28.9/sq mi)
- Time zone: UTC+01:00 (CET)
  - Summer (DST): UTC+02:00 (CEST)
- INSEE/Postal code: 36067 /36310
- ^{1} French Land Register data, which excludes lakes, ponds, glaciers > 1 km^{2} (0.386 sq mi or 247 acres) and river estuaries.

Dunet (French pronunciation: [dynɛ]) is a commune in the Indre department in central France.

== Geography ==
The river Anglin forms part of the commune's northeastern border.

== Population ==
Historical population
Year	Pop.	±% p.a.
1968	147	—
1975	148	+0.10%
1982	136	−1.20%
1990	112	−2.40%
1999	106	−0.61%
2007	112	+0.69%
2012	106	−1.10%
2017	101	−0.96%
2023	103	+0.33%
Source: INSEE

== See also ==
- Communes of the Indre department
