= Sacierges-Saint-Martin =

- Commune
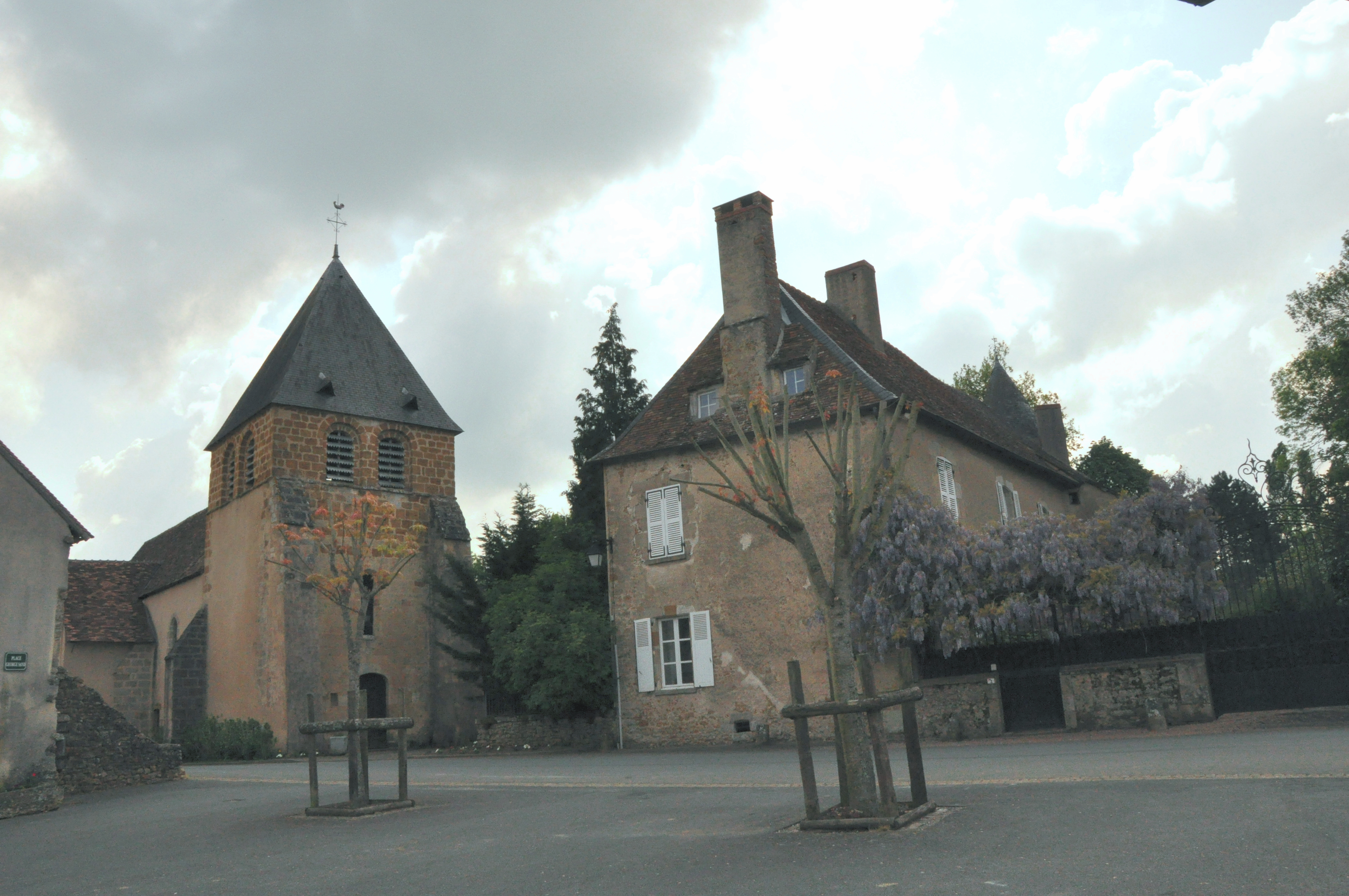
- The church in Sacierges-Saint-Martin
- Location of Sacierges-Saint-Martin
- Location within France Location within Centre-Val de Loire
- Coordinates: 46°29′43″N 1°21′57″E
- Country: France
- Region: Centre-Val de Loire
- Department: Indre
- Arrondissement: Le Blanc
- Canton: Saint-Gaultier
- Intercommunality: Brenne Val de Creuse

Government
  - Mayor (2020–2026): Thierry Bernard
- Area^{1}: 31.17 km^{2} (12.03 sq mi)
- Elevation: 135 m (443 ft)
- Highest elevation: 224 m (735 ft)
- Lowest elevation: 125 m (410 ft)
- Population (2023): 312
  - Density: 10.0/km^{2} (25.9/sq mi)
- Time zone: UTC+01:00 (CET)
  - Summer (DST): UTC+02:00 (CEST)
- INSEE/Postal code: 36177 /36170
- ^{1} French Land Register data, which excludes lakes, ponds, glaciers > 1 km^{2} (0.386 sq mi or 247 acres) and river estuaries.

Sacierges-Saint-Martin (Limousin: Chapsierjas) is a commune in the Indre department in central France.

== Geography ==
The commune is located in the parc naturel régional de la Brenne.

The river Abloux flows west through the northern part of the commune.

== Population ==
Historical population
Year	Pop.	±% p.a.
1968	523	—
1975	475	−1.37%
1982	375	−3.32%
1990	350	−0.86%
1999	337	−0.42%
2007	329	−0.30%
2012	313	−0.99%
2017	318	+0.32%
2023	312	−0.32%
Source: INSEE

== See also ==
- Communes of the Indre department
