= Taillebourg =

Taillebourg may refer to:

- Taillebourg, Charente-Maritime, a French commune
- Taillebourg, Lot-et-Garonne, a French commune of the Lot-et-Garonne department
- Battle of Taillebourg
- Château de Taillebourg
