= Philippe de Culant =

French nobleman and soldier

- Born: 1413
- Died: December 1454 (aged 41)
- Allegiance: France
- Rank: Marshal of France
- Conflicts: The Hundred Years War: Taillebourg; Le Mans; Château Gaillard; Rouen; Bayeux; Caen; Cherbourg; Bergerac; Castillon

Philippe de Culant (1413 – December 1454) was a French nobleman and soldier of the Hundred Years' War.

He was a nephew of Louis de Culant, Admiral of France, and the brother of Charles de Culant, and related to Jean de Brosse by marriage. The de Culant family took their name from the village of Culant (now Culan) in the modern department of Cher. Philippe was Lord of nearby Jaloignes and later seneschal of the Limousin.

He participated the sieges of Meaux (1439) and Pontoise (1441), and was made a Marshal of France in 1441 by King Charles VII of France for his services. He accompanied the heir to the throne, the future King Louis XI of France, on campaign in Germany in 1444 and served in many of the successful sieges which brought the Hundred Years' War to an end, including those of Taillebourg, Le Mans, Château Gaillard, Rouen, Bayeux, Caen, Cherbourg, and Bergerac. He entered Bordeaux alongside Jean de Dunois in 1451 and fought in the final battle of the war at Castillon in 1453.
