= Louis de Culant =

French nobleman and Admiral of France

- Born: 1360
- Died: 1444 (aged 83–84)
- Allegiance: France
- Rank: Admiral of France
- Conflicts: The Hundred Years War: The Battle of Orleans; Beaugency; Jargeau; Meung; Patay

Admiral Louis de Culant (or Culan) (1360–1444) was a French nobleman and Admiral of France. He held the titles of Baron of Châteauneuf-sur-Cher, Lord of Culant and Ainay-le-Vieil. As Lord of Culant, the Château de Culan, a medieval fortress built in the 12th-15th centuries, which overlooks the valley of the Arnon belonged to him.

== Personal life ==
De Culant's family included brother John Culant, Lord of Crete; nephew Philippe de Culant, Marshal of France; and nephew Charles de Culant († ca.1451), Grand Master of France, who plotted a conspiracy against him. He was also cousin to Jean de Brosse, the royal army's commander, Marshall of Boussac and Sainte-Sévère, with whom he fought alongside as lieutenant during the Hundred Years' War.

== Career ==
De Culant and De Brosse were chosen to accompany Joan of Arc at the head of a troupe that joined the bulk of the forces royal march on Orleans, participating in the Battle of Orleans. From Orleans to Paris, De Culant fought on land with Joan of Arc.

He served as Admiral of France in 1421 through 1437 when he was removed from office due to allegations of misappropriation of public funds. De Culant participated in several other battles, including those at Beaugency, Jargeau, Meung, and Patay.
