= Édouard Marquis =

French radio and television host (1969–2020)

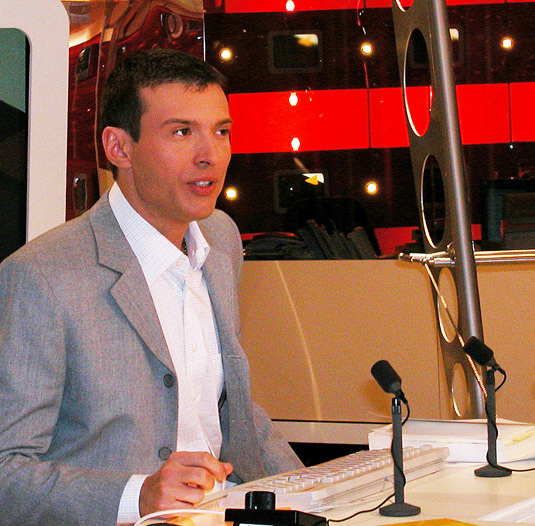
- Born: 17 August 1969; Paris, France
- Died: 23 November 2020 (aged 51); Montluçon, France
- Education: Collège Saint-François-de-Sales in Évreux
- Occupations: Radio and TV Host

Édouard Marquis (17 August 1969 – 23 November 2020) was a French radio and television host, journalist, and producer. He was co-proprietor of the Château de Culan.

== Biography ==
Marquis attended the Collège Saint-François-de-Sales in Évreux and became editor-in-chief of the school newspaper, Le Pour Parler. While in school, he created the debate program "Face Aux Jeunes" on Ado FM. In 1992, he aired this program on France 3 Paris Île-de-France. Several personalities appeared on the program, including Ségolène Royal, Jacques Toubon, Cabu, Francis Huster, and Jean-Claude Carrière. He won the Défi Jeunes, put on by the Minister of Sports.

Marquis produced reports for France 2, Télé emploi, France 5, and MCM. On MCM, he presented the program "NetSurf". This turned into a 26-minute weekly special with guests called "NetSurf Hebdo". From 1997 to 1998, he presented the program "NetZik", which focused on the internet, music, and youth culture.

During his time as a television host, Marquis organized "La Nuit du Net", an internet festival which took place in June 1996 at the Bataclan. He organized a broadcast on "La Nuit du Net" in March 1998 on MCM and TV5Monde, which featured celebrities such as Jean-Michel Jarre, Indochine, Louis Bertignac, Axel Bauer, and Éric Serra.

Marquis would leave the world of television and became a consultant. He also looked after the Château de Culan, which he looked after with his father.

Édouard Marquis died in Montluçon on 23 November 2020 at the age of 51.
