= Philippe-Ernest Legrand =

French Hellenist (1866-1953)

- Born: Philippe Alexandre Ernest Félix Legrand; 2 September 1866; Saint-Doulchard
- Died: 1 June 1953 (aged 86); Culan
- Occupation: Historian

Philippe-Ernest Legrand (2 September 1866 – 1 July 1953) was a French Hellenist. An historian, philologist, archaeologist, epigrapher, his great work was the translation and editing of Histories (Herodotus), published in the Collection Budé, which is still a reference.

== Career ==
Philippe-Ernest Legrand studied at the École Normale Supérieure from 1885 to 1888 and received a doctorate of Letters in 1898; One of his thesis was on Theocritus, and his complementary thesis was entitled Quo animo Graeci praesertim V° et VI° saeculis tum in vita privata tum in publicis rebus divinationem adhibuerint.

He taught at the University of Lyon from 1891 until 1926. In 1902, he obtained the chair of Greek philology and epigraphy, and then, from 1920, that of Greek language and literature. He took early retirement in 1926, and settled in the Château de Culan to work on his edition of Herodotus.

He was also a member of the French School at Athens between 1888 and 1891 and a member of the Académie des Inscriptions et Belles-Lettres from 1933.

== Work ==
Besides Herodotus, he studied the work of many Greek poets, including the Bucolics. A specialist of literary history, he was also strongly interested in Menander, who was rediscovered at the beginning of the century thanks to the Oxyrhynchus Papyri as well as in new comedy. An incomplete list of authors on which he worked includes Sophron, Callimachus, Herondas, Leonidas of Tarentum, the pseudo-Theocritus, Bion of Phlossa, Moschos, and John Chrysostom.

== Bibliography ==
=== Editions and monographies ===
- 1898: Étude sur Théocrite, "Bibliothèque des Écoles françaises d'Athènes et de Rome", fasc. LXXIX
- 1910: Daos : Tableau de la Comédie grecque pendant la période dite nouvelle, Lyon, Fontemoing
- 1924: La Poésie alexandrine, Payot
- 1925–1927: Les Bucoliques grecs, Paris, Les Belles Lettres, Collection des Universités de France, 2 vol.
  - 1925: Théocrite
  - 1927: Pseudo-Théocrite, Moschos, Bion, divers
- 1932–1954: Édition et traduction de Hérodote, Histoires, Paris, Les Belles Lettres, Collection des Universités de France, 10 vol.
  - 1932: Introduction
  - 1932: Livre I: Clio
  - 1936: Livre II: Euterpe
  - 1939: Livre III: Thalie
  - 1945: Livre IV: Melpomène
  - 1946: Livre V: Terpsichore
  - 1948: Livre VI: Erato
  - 1951: Livre VII: Polymnie
  - 1953: Livre VIII: Uranie
  - 1954: Livre IX: Calliope
  - 1966: Index analytique

=== Articles ===
An extended list of articles by Philippe-Ernest Legrand can be found in Mollat, Guillaume (1954). "Notice sur la vie et les travaux de M. Philippe Legrand". Comptes rendus des séances de l'Académie des Inscriptions et Belles-Lettres (in French). Vol. 98, no. 4. pp. 413–418. ISSN 0065-0536..
