= Château de Taillebourg =

Ruined castle in Charente-Maritime, France

- Taillebourg, Charente-Maritime, France
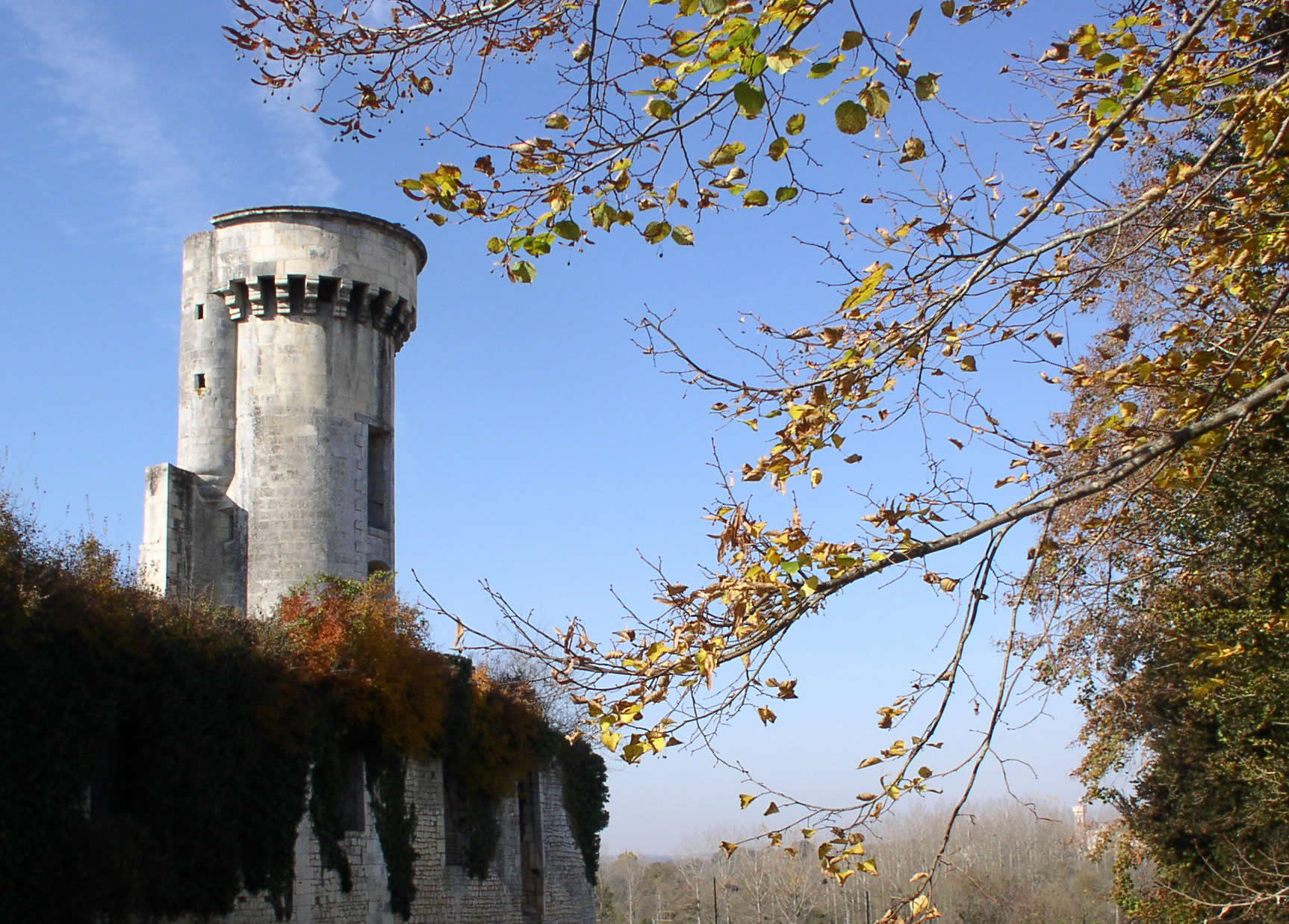
- Château de Taillebourg

Location
- Coordinates: 45°50′02″N 0°38′51″W

The Château de Taillebourg is a ruined castle from the medieval era. It is built on a rocky outcrop, overlooking the village of Taillebourg and the valley of the river Charente, in the Charente-Maritime department of France. It commanded a very strategic position and was therefore the focus of much conflict throughout the medieval era.

It featured in several episodes of the Hundred Years' War and the Saintonge War before that.

== Louis VII and Eleanor of Aquitaine ==
The previous castle on the site was shelter for Louis VII of France and Eleanor of Aquitaine on the day after their wedding, in July 1137.

== Richard the Lionheart ==
Richard the Lionheart conquered this castle in 1179. It belonged at that time to Geoffrey de Rancon, who later participated alongside Richard in the Third Crusade and appears as a witness to Richard's peace treaty with King Tancred of Sicily in Messina on October 6, 1190. In 1173, Richard had rebelled against his father King Henry II in alliance with his brothers Henry and Geoffrey and the King of France, Louis VII. After their rebellion failed, Henry II assigned Richard to bring the rebellious lords of Aquitaine to heel.

At the time the castle of Taillebourg, situated on an outcropping of rock over the Charente, was regarded as impregnable: three sides were set above sheer rock faces and the fourth was protected by a triple wall. Nevertheless, Richard invested the castle on May 1, 1179, and bombarded it with trebuchets. On May 8, Richard burned the surrounding fields and vineyards in order to bait the burghers defending the town walls into sallying out. Richard defeated them, pursued them as they retreated back through the gate, and laid waste to the town. The garrison, which had relied upon the supplies in the town, soon surrendered. The overthrow of Taillebourg so demoralized Geoffrey de Rancon that he surrendered his other great castle, Pons, to Richard, ending Geoffrey's rebellion.

== Louis IX ==
The castle was later the base for Louis IX of France (Saint Louis), as a guest of Geoffrey IV of Rancon, before the Battle of Taillebourg in 1242.

== Public garden ==
The Château de Taillebourg ruins have today been converted to a public garden where visitors can admire the 18th-century battlements and the underground rooms of the old castle. The site's geographical position affords a view of the Charente valley.

== See also ==
- List of castles in France
