= Chaillac =

- Commune
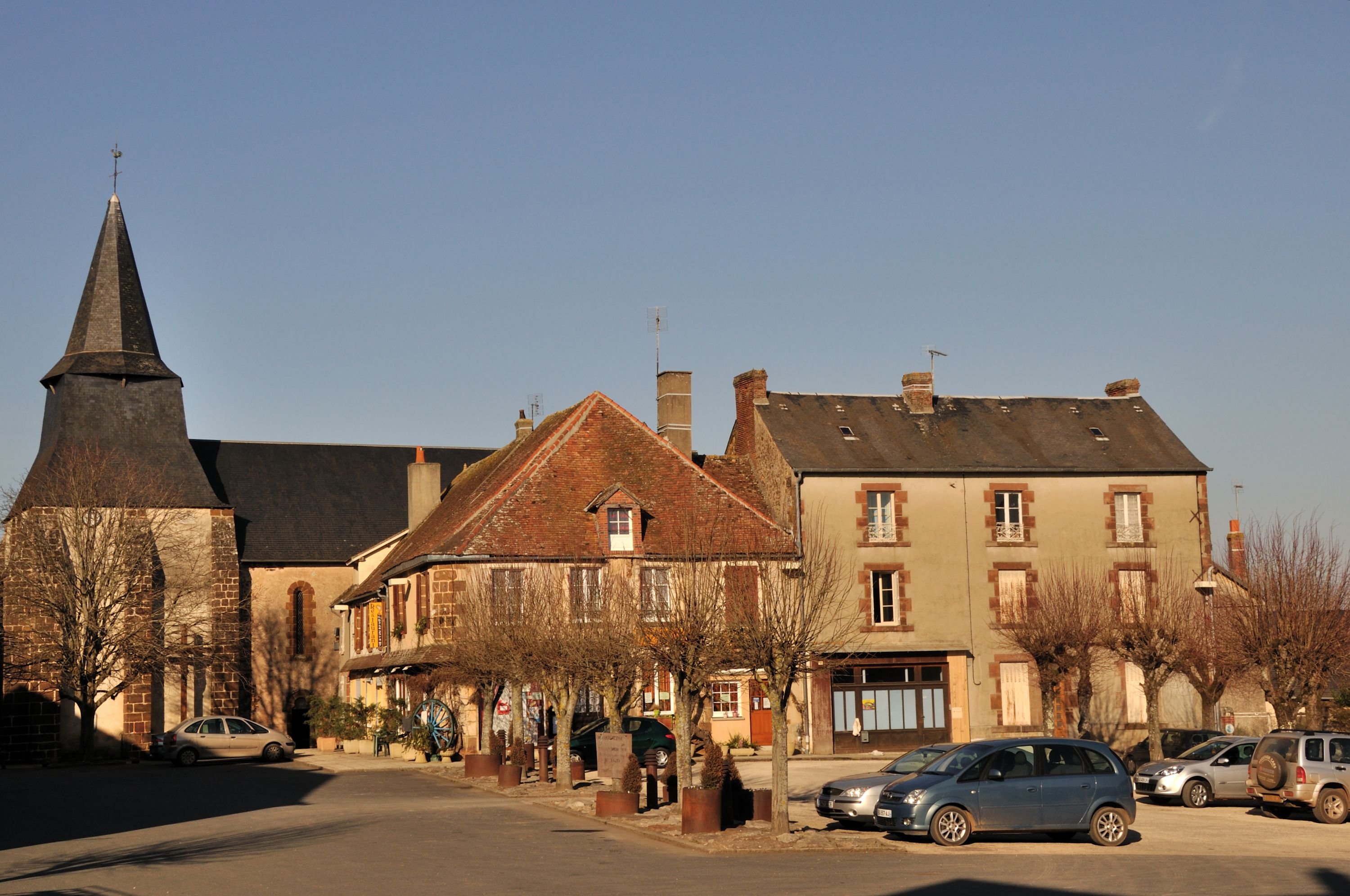
- The place du Bosquet

- Coat of arms
- Location of Chaillac
- Location within France Location within Centre-Val de Loire
- Coordinates: 46°26′07″N 1°17′59″E
- Country: France
- Region: Centre-Val de Loire
- Department: Indre
- Arrondissement: Le Blanc
- Canton: Saint-Gaultier

Government
  - Mayor (2023–2026): Anthony Dubus
- Area^{1}: 59.79 km^{2} (23.09 sq mi)
- Elevation: 196 m (643 ft)
- Highest elevation: 253 m (830 ft)
- Lowest elevation: 122 m (400 ft)
- Population (2023): 1,021
  - Density: 17.08/km^{2} (44.23/sq mi)
- Time zone: UTC+01:00 (CET)
  - Summer (DST): UTC+02:00 (CEST)
- INSEE/Postal code: 36035 /36310
- ^{1} French Land Register data, which excludes lakes, ponds, glaciers > 1 km^{2} (0.386 sq mi or 247 acres) and river estuaries.

Chaillac (French pronunciation: [ʃajak]; Limousin: Chalhac) is a commune in the Indre department in central France.

== Geography ==
The commune is traversed by the river Anglin. The surrounding land is primarily clay which results in ground cracking and building shifts throughout the region.

== History ==
Château de Brosse, located on the old town of Brosse, was the possession of Viscount de Brosse, who were powerful in the Middle Ages, and even had their own mint in the eleventh century. However, the village was created around the castle, located in a cul-de-sac, Chaillac was never completed, especially after being destroyed by the Anglo-Poitou in 1370.

== Population ==
Historical population
Year	Pop.	±% p.a.
1968	1,358	—
1975	1,253	−1.14%
1982	1,149	−1.23%
1990	1,246	+1.02%
1999	1,170	−0.70%
2007	1,158	−0.13%
2012	1,103	−0.97%
2017	1,095	−0.15%
2023	1,021	−1.16%
Source: INSEE

== See also ==
- Communes of the Indre department
- Rochechouart impact structure
- Saint-Benoît-du-Sault
- Château de Brosse

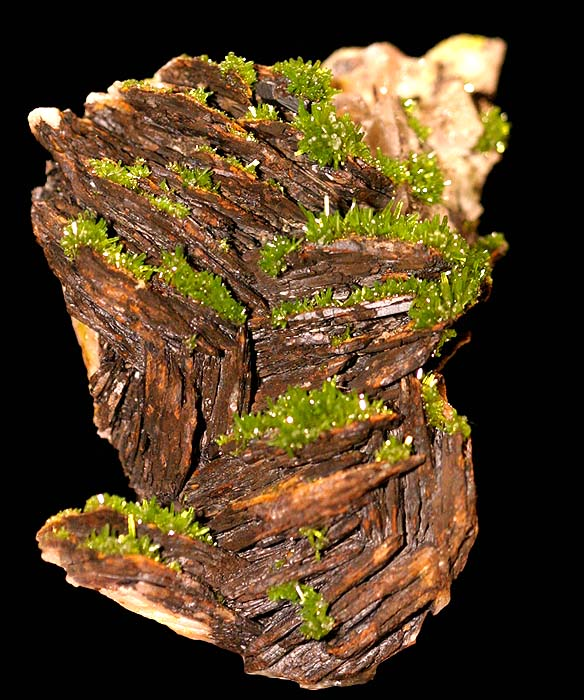
Pyromorphite (green) and Fluorite (yellow) on Barite, Chaillac Mine.
