= Saintonge War =

Anglo-French conflict of Louis IX and England

- Part of the First Hundred Years' War
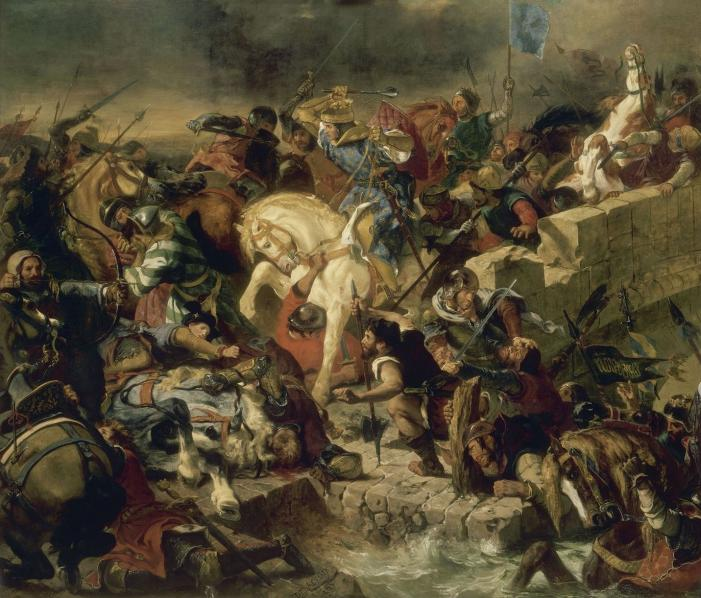
- St. Louis IX at the Battle of Taillebourg, by Eugène Delacroix
Date	1242–1243
Location	Saintonge, France
Result	French victory

Belligerents
Kingdom of France; County of Poitou	Kingdom of England; Earldom of Cornwall; County of La Marche; County of Toulouse

Commanders and leaders
Louis IX; Alphonse of Poitiers	Henry III; Richard of Cornwall; Hugh X of Lusignan; Raymond VII of Toulouse; Hugh d'Aubigny, 5th Earl of Arundel

Strength
Contemporary sources: 50,000; Modern estimates: ~25,000	~30,000

Casualties and losses
Light	Heavy

The Saintonge War was a feudal dynastic conflict that occurred between 1242 and 1243. It opposed Capetian forces supportive of King Louis IX's brother Alphonse, Count of Poitiers and those of Hugh X of Lusignan, Raymond VII of Toulouse and Henry III of England. The latter hoped to regain the Angevin possessions lost during his father's reign. Saintonge is the region around Saintes in the centre-west of France and is the place where most of fighting occurred.

The conflict arose because vassals of Louis in Poitou were displeased with his brother, Alphonse, being made Count of Poitou and preferred the title went to the English king's brother, Richard of Cornwall instead. The French decisively defeated the English and rebel forces at the Battle of Taillebourg and concluded the struggle at the Siege of Saintes. Louis further repressed the Toulousians into surrendering. He restored Guyenne to Henry as a noble gesture and to seek for further peace so that he could go on a crusade. The battle was the last major conflict between the English and French until the Gascon War of 1294–1303.

The war announced the end of Henry's hopes of restoring the Angevin Empire lost under King John I of England and further planted the seeds for the Second Barons' War in England, due to the waste of funds and to the growing resentment among the barons towards the king, for what was from their point of view his tyrannical ways (by ignoring Magna Carta), and for his incompetence in war.

== A feudal revolt ==
This precursor to France and England's Hundred Years War was caused by the revolt of a Poitevin baron, Hugh X, lord of Lusignan. The deeper source of this conflict was the French king Philip Augustus's seizure of French lands, specifically in Poitiers, held by John, King of England. Although Richard Earl of Cornwall, John's second oldest son and brother to Henry III, was count of Poitiers after John's death, this was only nominal. King Louis VIII, son of Philip Augustus, had instead reserved the title for his second oldest son, Alphonse de Poitiers. In June 1241, king Louis IX of France, son of Louis VIII, held a plenary court at Saumur in Anjou and announced that his brother, Alphonse, having come of age, was ready to come into possession of the title. On that occasion, Alphonse received the homage of the lords of the province, given even by the most powerful of them, Hugh X of Lusignan.

Hugh possessed several lands in Poitou, including his family stronghold in Lusignan, the castle of Montreuil-Bonnin and, above all, the County of Marche. Lusignan had a long tradition of autonomy in the heart of Aquitaine, far from the successive capitals of the kingdoms of France and England. Therefore, the Lusignans were not receptive to Capetian authority in the region. Isabelle of Angoulême, mother to Henry and Richard, and now spouse of Hugh, was particularly frustrated that her son had not officially received the title that he had nominally held. Along with a number of other Poitevin lords, Hugh could not accept the loss of autonomy to the increasingly growing demesne of the Capetian royal family, and thus the Poitevin nobility formed a confederacy against the House of Capet. The starting point for the conflict was at Christmas time in 1241, when Hugh X of Lusignan, no doubt at the instigation of Isabelle, insulted the new Count of Poitiers in his own palace, by refusing allegiance. Raymond VII of Toulouse, Count of Toulouse, sought redress for the Treaty of Paris of 1229 (which ended the Albigensian Crusade), under the terms of which he had lost most of his lands, and thus joined the revolting barons as well, but would not participate in the fighting for a while.

== The Capetian reaction ==
Immediately, the Capetian family reacted. On 5 January 1242, Count Alphonse of Poitiers called together the Poitevin nobles at Chinon for Easter. The faithful lords, and others less loyal but nonetheless enemies of Lusignan, responded to the appeal. Although his mother Blanche of Castile had coped with baronial uprisings before and carried on the royal affairs since 1226, with the title "baillistre" (protector of the heir in feudal law), Louis IX decided to go to the assistance of his brother and forcibly take control of the County of La Marche. In April, Louis assembled a force at Chinon that some contemporaries estimated at 50,000. (Note: Modern estimates put Louis at the head of around 25,000 troops containing 1,000 wagons, 4,000 knights, and 20,000 squires, sergeants, and crossbowmen.) On 9 May, he marched against the castle of Montreuil-Bonnin, the fortress of Lusignan. After having seized a multitude of rebel castles, he steered towards Saintes. On 20 May, Henry and Richard departed from Portsmouth for Royan and joined the rebelling French nobles, forming an army that may have numbered about 30,000. (Note: Modern estimates put Henry at the head of an army similar in size to Louis' army but varying in composition; 1,600 knights, 20,000 or more squires and sergeants, and 700 crossbowmen. Combined with rebel forces, the total number of men would have outnumbered the Franco-Poitevin troops.) The two kings exchanged letters, but these resolved nothing. Henry had intentions to regain the past Angevin Empire of his predecessors on the basis that the title of Count of Poitou still belonged to his brother, Richard. This was not the first war that Henry had waged in France either as he had earlier led an expedition to France in 1230, (Note: The vast majority of wars and conflicts in the High Middle Ages involved besieging castles, capturing cities, small skirmishes, and raids, and did not always involve a large-scale battle.) however, Henry was convinced that Hugh would provide the necessary support to reverse the lacklustre results of the last war. While completing his conquest of lower Poitou, he declared war on Saint Louis on 16 July. On 20 July, the French army arrived at Taillebourg where the inevitable clash took place.

== Battle of Taillebourg ==
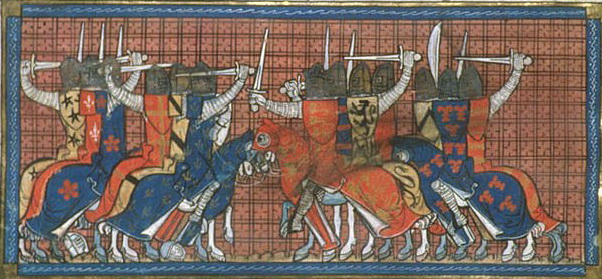
Battle between the French (Louis IX) and the English (Henry III). (British Library, Royal 16 G VI f. 399)

Henry advanced to Tonnay-Charente by mid-July and Louis moved to Saint-Jean-d'Angély, just north of Taillebourg, the armies intending to reach the bridge across the river Charente, located in the commune of Taillebourg. Henry and Hugh positioned their army near the village of Saint-James on the west bank of the river and camped in the neighbouring field, while Louis was welcomed to the fortified chateau of Geoffroy de Rancon, the Lord of Taillebourg. Henry decided to send an advance guard to protect the left bank of the Taillebourg bridge, a move that led to a sharp encounter with some French troops on either 21 or 22 July. Louis decided to follow up this engagement and launched a full offensive with the entire French army. The aggressive French assaults carried the day and the English king fled south to the town of Saintes, along with the revolting barons. A prolonged melee fight ensued north of Saintes, however the English were defeated in a definitive fashion. Louis lost fewer men than the English army but had to face with an epidemic of dysentery that ravaged his army. This forced Louis and his men to return to Paris by August.

== Siege of Saintes ==
On 22 or 23 July the French army laid siege to the city of Saintes. Henry realized that Hugh did not have as much support as he may have earlier claimed and withdrew to Bordeaux. Shortly afterwards, the citizens handed over the keys to the city to Louis.

== The resolution of the revolt in France ==
Recognizing that he was in a hopeless position after the siege of Saintes, Hugh surrendered to Louis on 24 July. The settlement of the feudal revolt was devastating for Hugh. His Poitevin castles were confiscated, rearmed, and sold by Alphonse of Poitiers. He further humiliated himself by coming to Louis crying and kneeling before him with his wife and three sons and asked for forgiveness. His daughter Isabel of Lusignan was married to his enemy Geoffrey of Rancon in 1250, who rebuilt his castle with the dowry.

It is only during the retreat of the English and rebel forces that Raymond of Toulouse began his campaign against the king. He was able to capture the cities of Narbonne and Albi within August. Unfortunately for Raymond, Roger IV, Count of Foix and vassal to Raymond, stubbornly resisted his war efforts by making his own war with Raymond and submitting only to the king. This gave Louis time to organize an army and split it into two to retake the captured cities. By 30 November, the war with the king came to an end. The war with Roger would persist until January 1243 and would end in yet another defeat for Raymond. Under subjugation, Raymond was forced to give up the two cities that he took and made a promise to fight the Cathar heresy in return for a pardon from the king in Montargis.

== Blockade of La Rochelle ==
In a final desperate attempt to prevent a complete takeover of his lands in Aquitaine and Gascony, Henry organized a blockade on the port city of La Rochelle by sea to distract French forces from marching further south. The blockade was largely unsuccessful as the outcome of the war had already been mostly determined. Henry looked further for new allies. In January 1243, Henry sent a letter to Frederick II, Holy Roman Emperor, to whom he had made a request for an alliance earlier, announcing the end of his hopes for retaking his possessions in France. On 12 March, Henry was forced to ask Louis for a five-year truce.

== France and England make peace ==
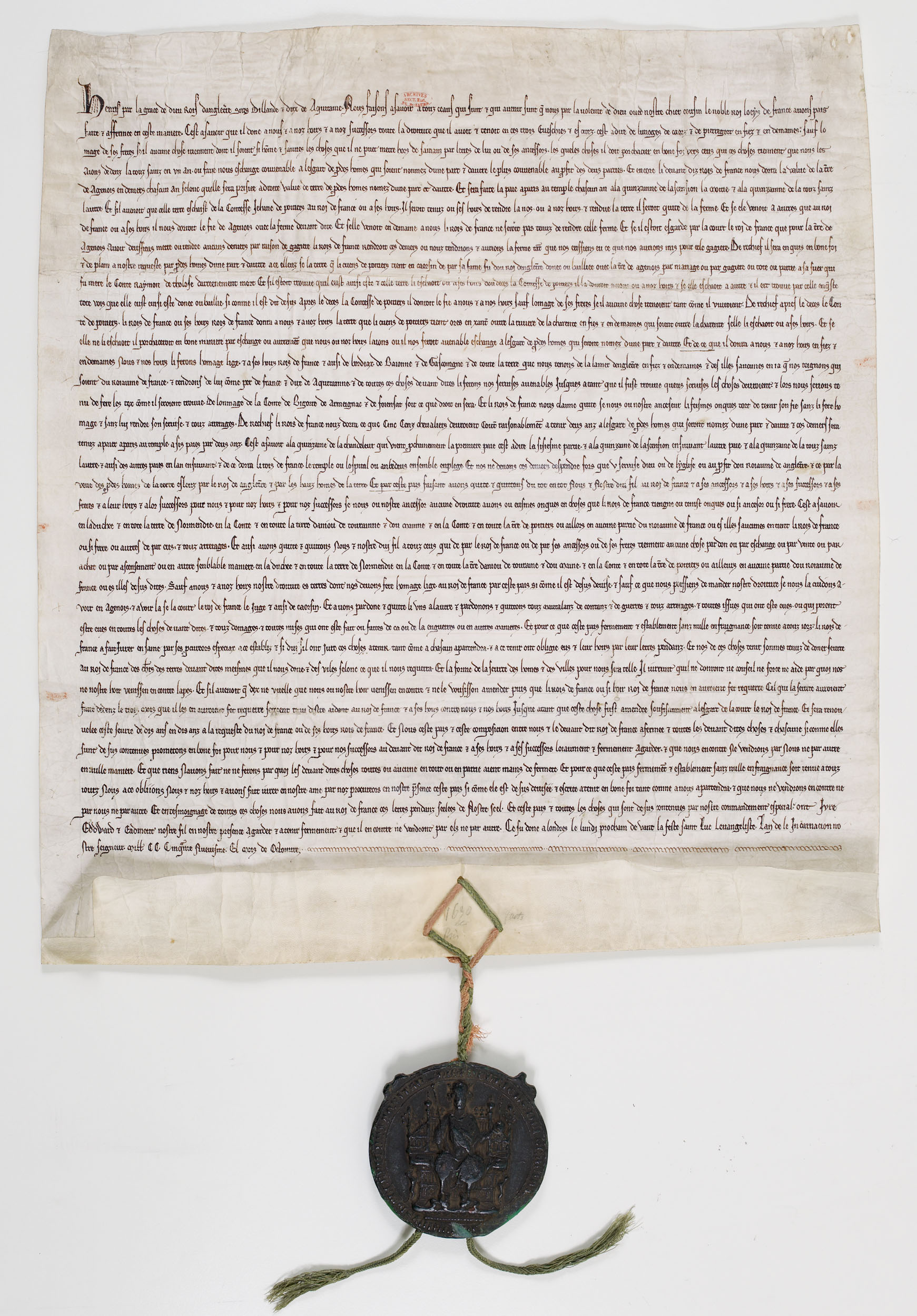
Treaty of Paris ratified in London on October 13, 1259, by Henry III, King of England, and Louis IX, sealed with the seal of Henry III in green wax on red and green silk cords.

A truce was signed at Pons on 1 August. A more lasting peace was concluded at Paris on 4 December 1259 amidst the threat of a second Baron's war in England. Initially, Henry refused to give up the rights the territory of his ancestors in France, however, Louis restored Guyenne to Henry, thinking that this noble gesture would assure him an extended time of peace with England because he was mostly concerned with going on the Seventh Crusade in 1248 and wanted to rally support for the cause within his own realm. By signing the treaty, Louis and Henry put an end to the century-old conflict between Capetians and Plantagenets concerning the lands inherited by Henry II of England conquered by Philip Augustus of France. By this text, Henry III renounced his claims concerning Normandy, Anjou, Touraine, Maine, and Poitou; in return Louis IX gave him the necessary sum to maintain 500 knights for two years, plus the revenues of the Agenais, and his domains in the dioceses of Limoges, Cahors and Périgueux. On February 10, 1259, the treaty was first ratified by Richard of Cornwall. On February 17, it was ratified in Westminster by prosecutors in the name of the king, and, by December 4, Simon V de Montfort and Eleanor of England also ratified the treaty. Finally, Henry arrived in France on December 4, to pay homage to Louis, thus symbolically ending the rivalry. Afterwards, an unexpected and lively friendship arose between the two kings to the point that, sometime later, Louis offered Henry an elephant which had been given to him by the Sultan of Egypt: He also, as Henry's feudal overlord, ratified a papal bull that annulled the Provisions of Oxford, and declared himself as a firm supporter of the Royal prerogative in England.

== Historical background note ==
In English history, the 'Hundred Years' War' refers to the 116-year period between 1337 and 1453. In some French accounts, that period of conflict is referred to as the 'Second Hundred Years' War', the first embracing the period of upheaval following the change in the balance of power between the French and English thrones from 1159 to 1259 after Henry II of England married Eleanor of Aquitaine gaining many French territories in the process and achieving territorial superiority over the French Kingdom, until the Treaty of Paris (1259), in which the opposite became true. This period saw many conflicts and battles between the two kingdoms such as the 1202–1214 Anglo-French War and the Battle of Bouvines.
