= The Battle of Taillebourg, 21 July 1242 =

1837 painting by Eugène Delacroix

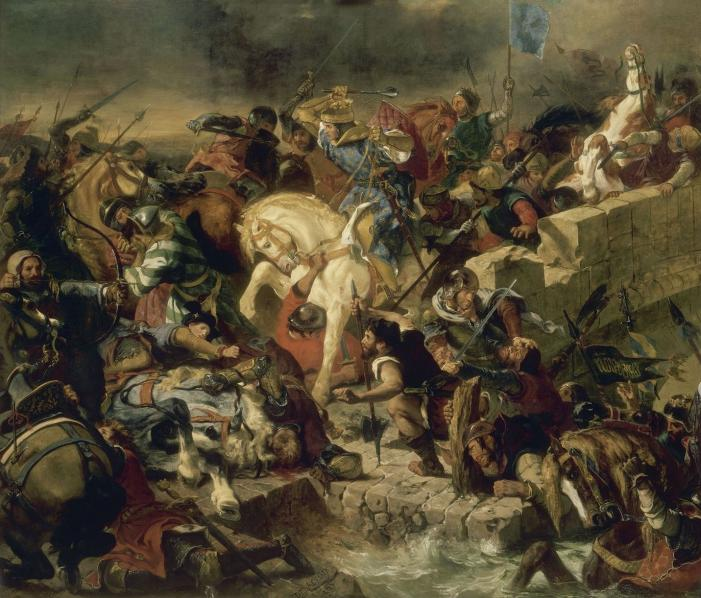
The Battle of Taillebourg, 21 July 1242 (1837 by Eugène Delacroix

The Battle of Taillebourg, 21 July 1242 is an 1837 painting of the Battle of Taillebourg by Eugène Delacroix, one of 33 huge works commissioned from different artists by Louis-Philippe I for his Gallery of Battles at the Palace of Versailles, inaugurated in 1837. It still hangs there, between Horace Vernet's The Battle of Bouvines, 27 July 1214 and Charles-Philippe Larivière's The Battle of Mons-en-Pévèle, 18 August 1304. It is Delacroix's only work in the Gallery.The painting was exhibited at the Salon of 1837..
