= Château d'Ainay-le-Vieil =

Medieval cobblestone castle in France

Coordinates: 46°40′5.5″N 2°32′59″E

Château of Ainay-le-Vieil
- Cher, Centre-Val de Loire; Near Ainay-le-Vieil in France
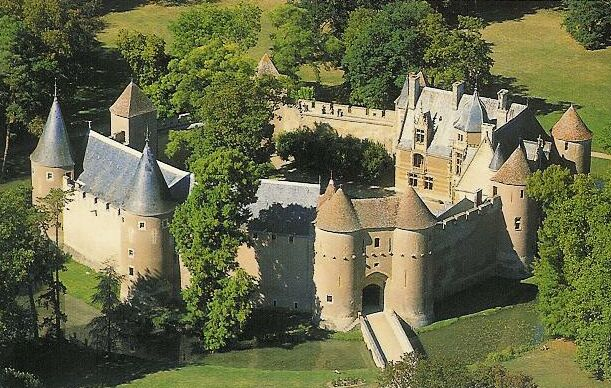
- Aerial view of the Château d'Ainay-le-Vieil

Site information
- Type: Château
- Operator: Monument historique (1968, 1998); Registered monument (1993)
- Website: chateau-ainaylevieil.fr

Location
- Location in France

Château d'Ainay-le-Vieil is a 14th-century castle built on the grounds of an earlier 12th-century castle in Ainay-le-Vieil, Cher, France. After having bought the castle from Jacques Cœur, Charles de Bigny built a pre-Renaissance Louis XII-style chateaux from 1500 to 1505. The castle has been listed as a Monument historique since 1968 by the French Ministry of Culture. The castle, now part of Jacques Cœur's tourist route, has been nicknamed "the little Carcassonne" (French: le petit Carcassonne) because of its circular shape. Today the castle is one of the best-preserved fortresses of the 14th century.

== Location ==
The castle is built on a site located on the frontier of the Frankish kingdom and that of Aquitaine (and later the lands of the French and English kingdoms) that has been fortified since the High Middle Ages and was once occupied by the Gallo-Romans. This location was thus strategically important, especially during the Hundred Years' War, and this can be attested to by its sizeable walls. Because of its importance to the French kings, it was entrusted to houses close to the king, such as the Bourbons, Barres, Sully, and Culants.

== History ==
The castle property is mentioned in a cartulary in Champagne at the end of the 11th century, naming a member of the House of Bourbon (rulers of Bourbonnais) and a brother of Charles Martel. It then passed into the ownership of Pierre Barres and his brother, Guillaume, who won fame for their family by saving the French king at the Battle of Bouvines in 1214. Next, the Sully family, of the Loire Valley, came into possession of the castle for over a century in a period wherein the castle became an important base from which to harass the English during the Hundred Years' War. After the French defeat at Poitiers in 1356, it became the only castle in the region to remain in French hands. Similarly, it lost all military importance with the French victory at the end of the Hundred Years' War.

Since 1467, the castle has been owned by the family of Jean-Baptiste Colbert, minister to the king, and it passed through the women of the family three generations in.

== Design and estate ==
Château d'Ainay-le-Vieil comprises two distinct parts: one medieval, and one pre-Renaissance in the Louis XII style. The landscaped gardens, noted for fruit, maple and oak trees, are a partner garden of the UK's Royal Horticultural Society.

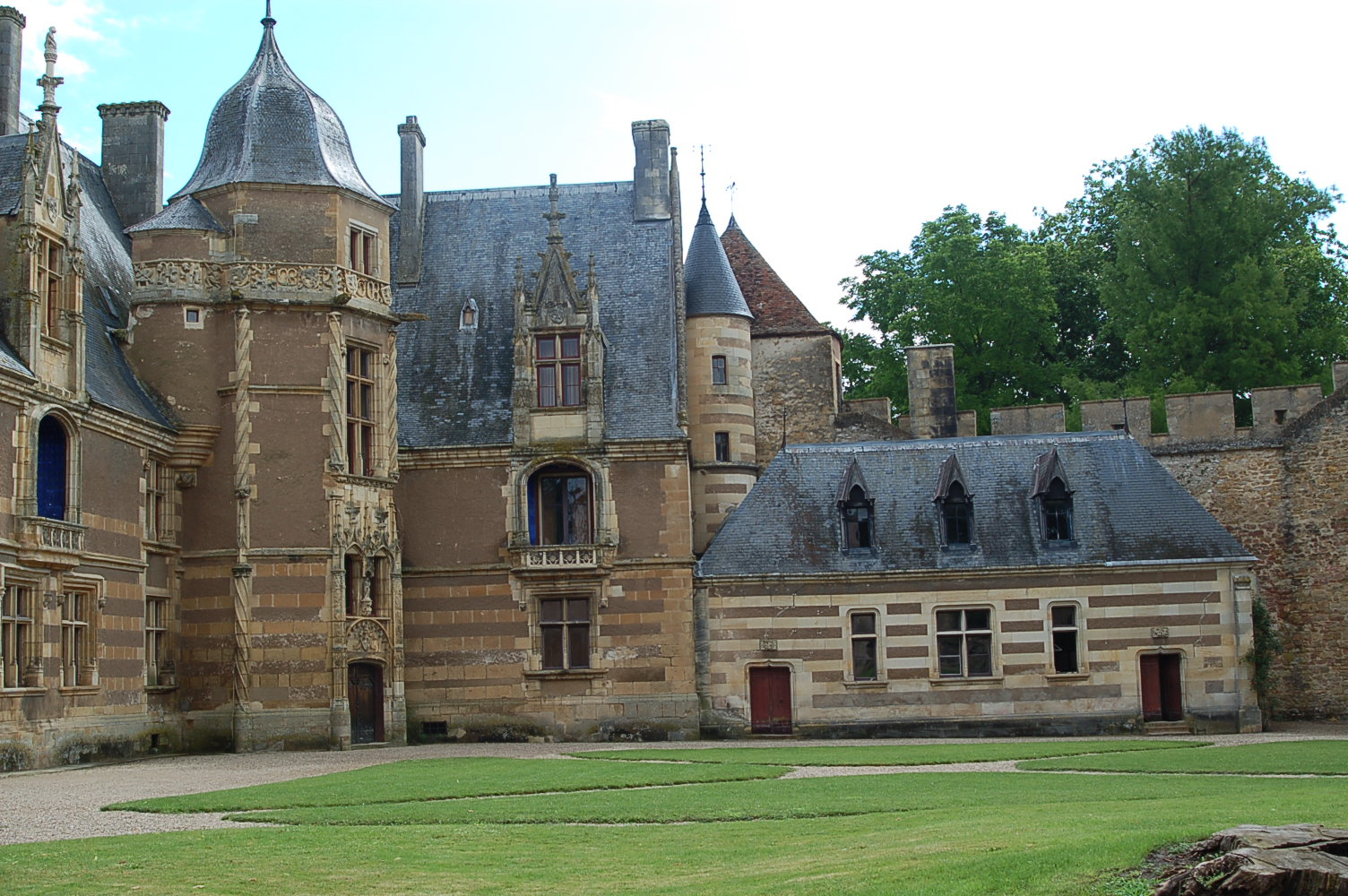
Renaissance-era house

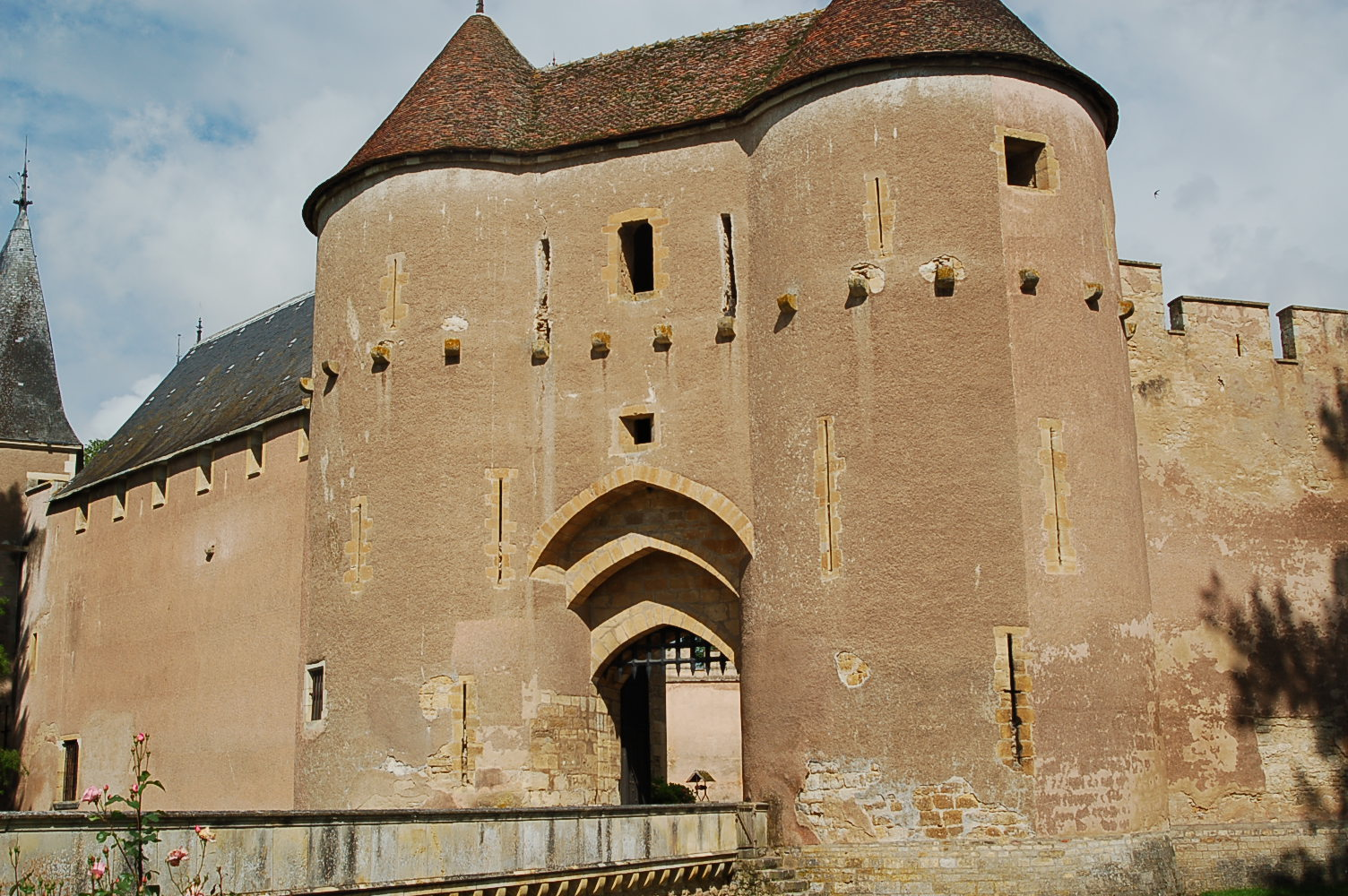
Gatehouse

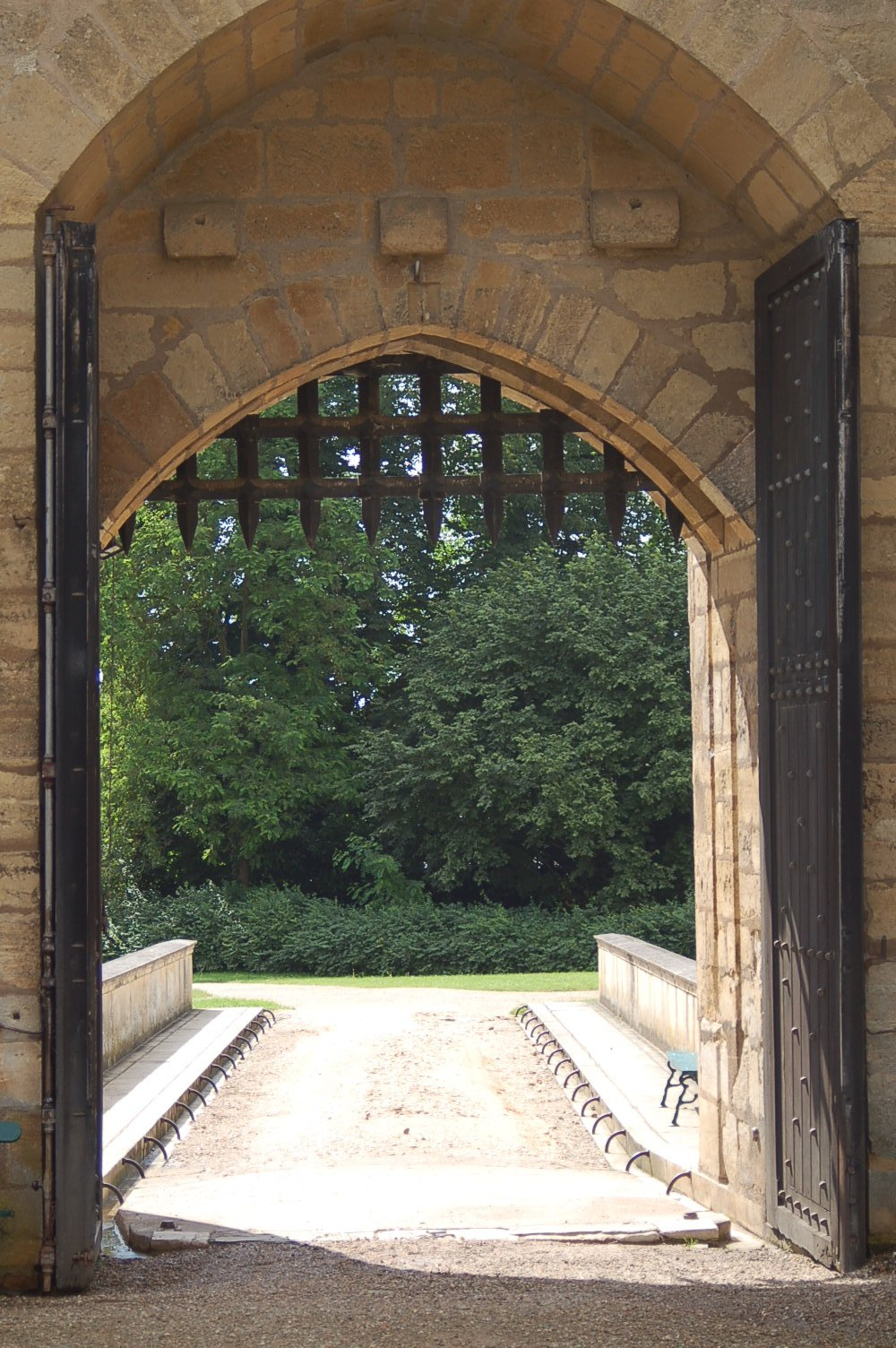
Portcullis

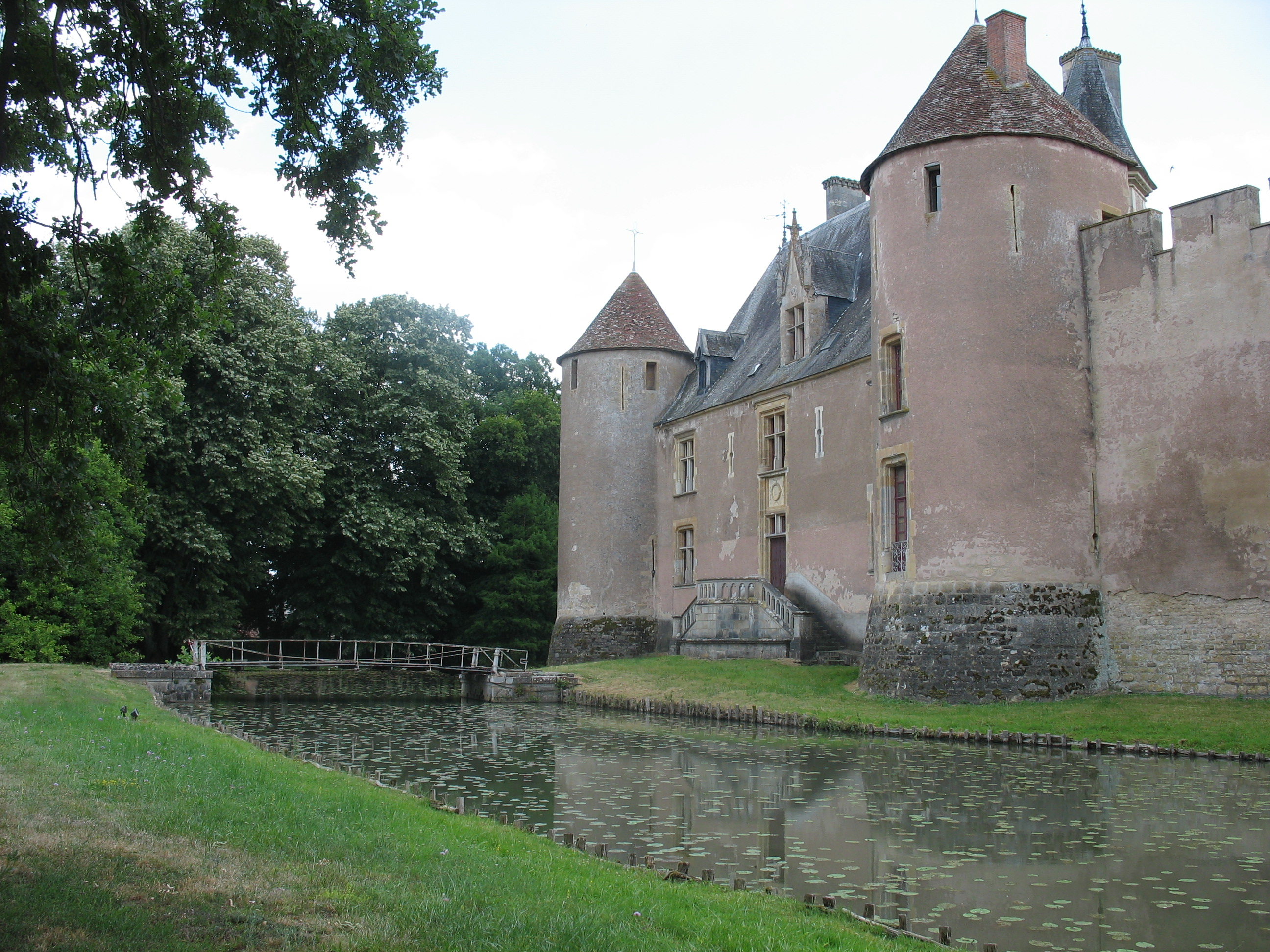
Moat

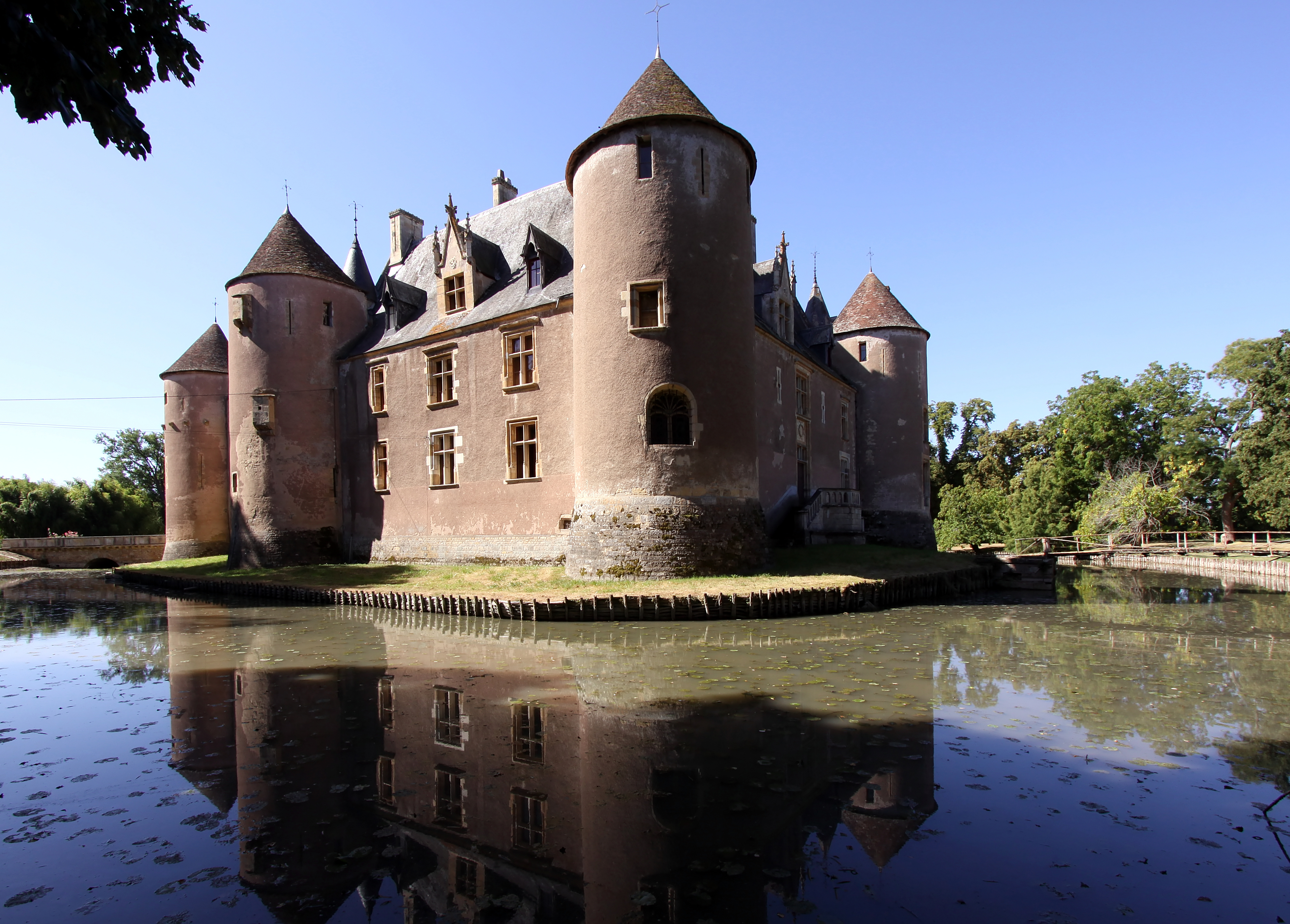

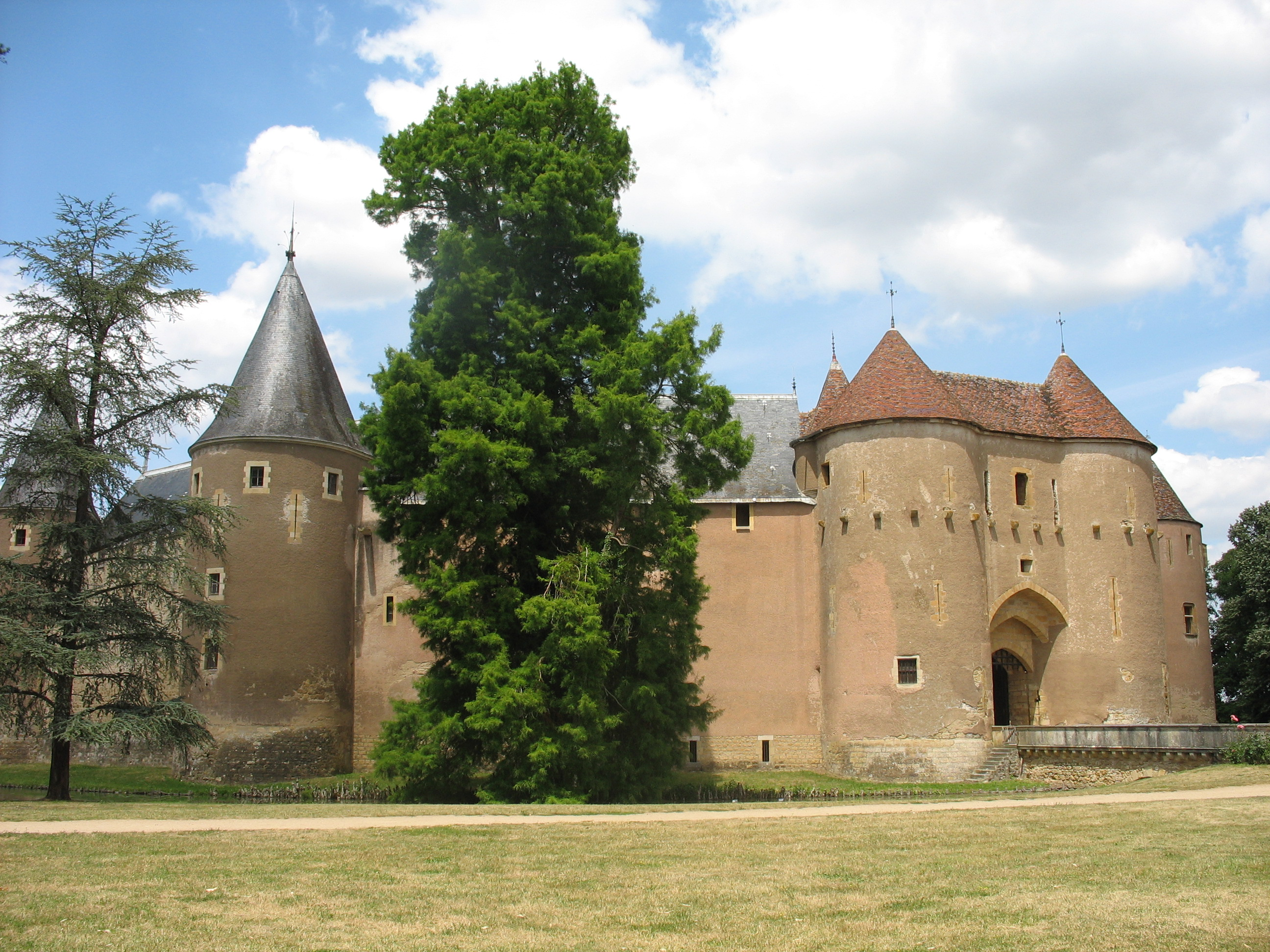

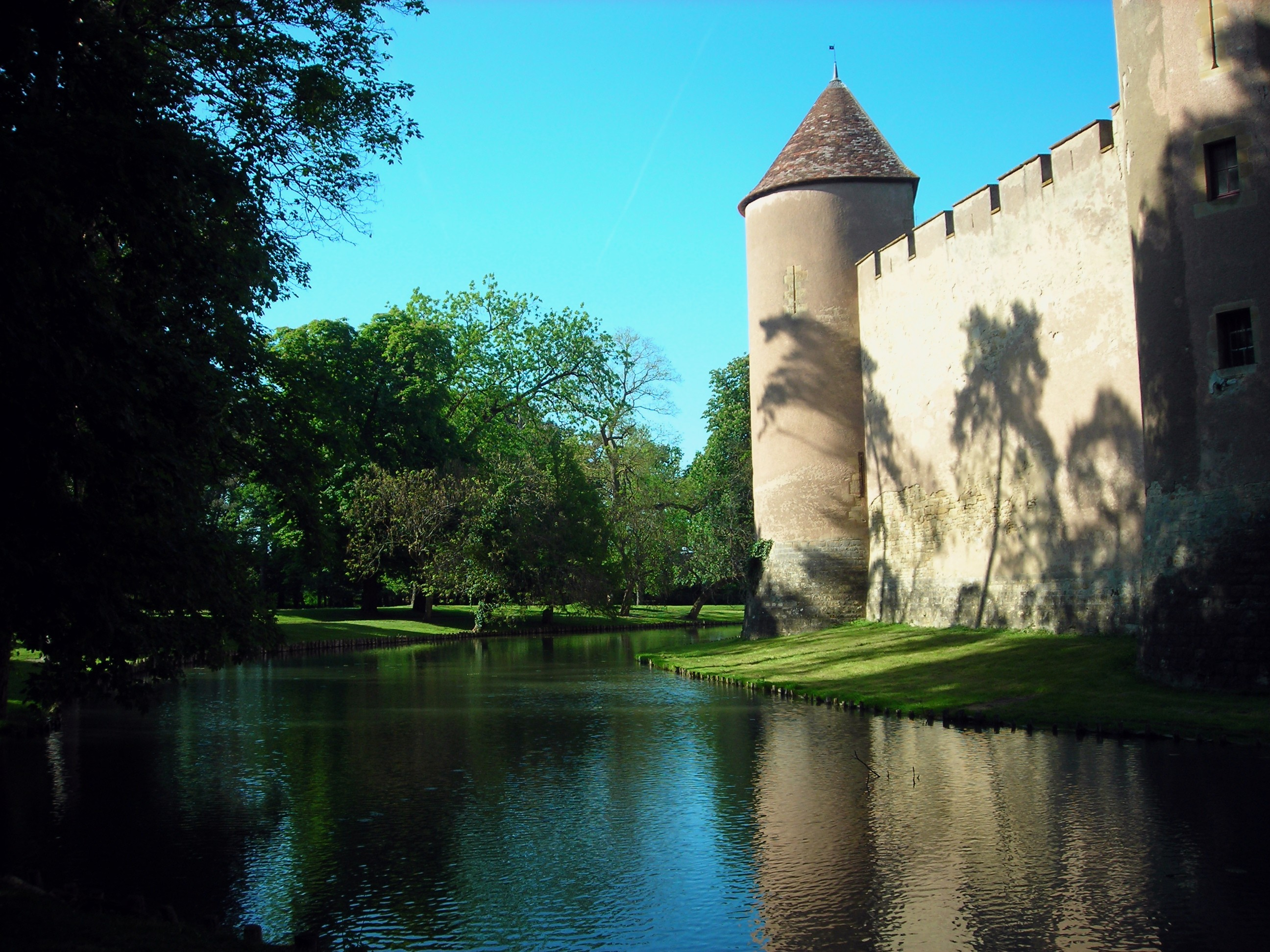

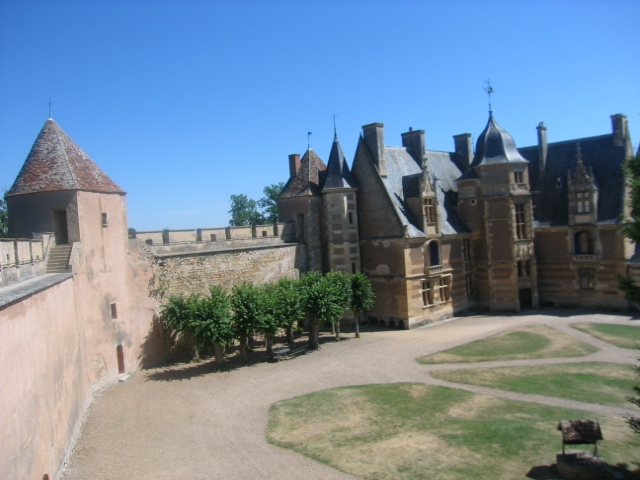

== See also ==
- List of castles in France
