= Jean de Brosse =

Medieval French nobleman (1375–1433)

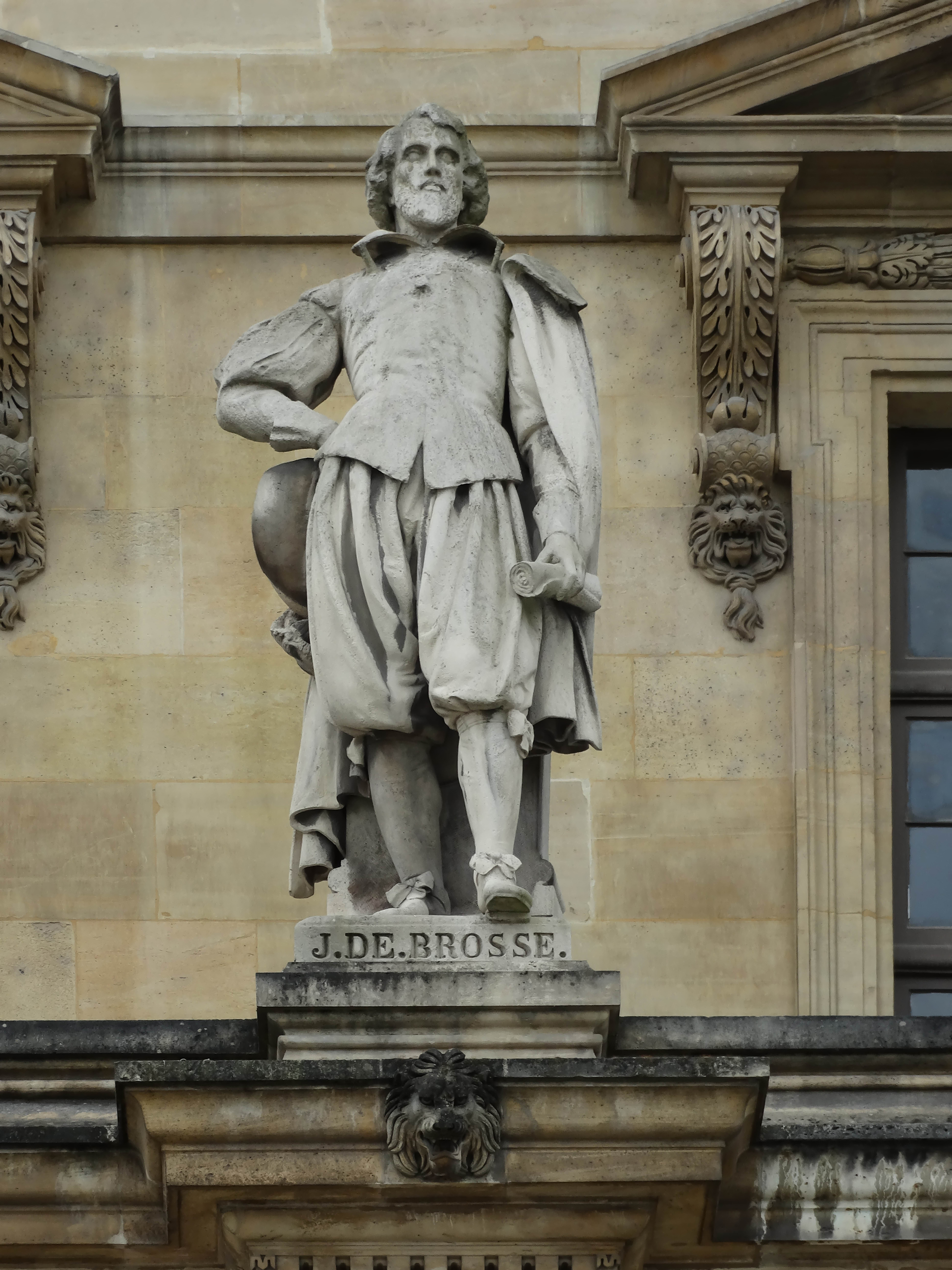
- Jean de Brosse statue at the Louvre, Paris, France.
- Born: 1375 Huriel, France
- Died: 1433 (aged 57–58) Boussac, France
- Allegiance: France
- Rank: Marshal of France
- Conflicts: Hundred Years' War: The Battle of Orleans

Jean de Brosse (1375–1433), Lord of Boussac, Sainte-Sévère and Huriel, was a councillor and chamberlain to Charles VII of France; he was made a Marshal of France in 1426.

== Early life ==
Jean de Brosse was born in 1375 in his father’s castle at Huriel to Pierre II de Brosse and Marguerite de Malleval. In 1419, at 44, de Brosse married Jeanne de Naillac.

== Hundred Years' War ==
De Brosse began fighting for France alongside his cousin, Louis de Culant. Probably through the influence of his family, de Brosse was made chamberlain to the Dauphin, the future Charles VII. The two soon became close friends.

In 1422, de Brosse’s father died, leaving his son his titles and estates. King Charles VI also died, and Charles VII took the title of king, though he was not crowned. Jean de Brosse and his wife had a son in the same year. They named him after his father.

On 16 May 1423, Charles VII charged de Brosse with ensuring his safety. Then on 14 July 1426, de Brosse was made a Marshal of France. He fought the English and their allies at the side of La Hire, Jean de Dunois, Jean Poton de Xaintrailles, and Arthur de Richemont. He soon began growing short of money, however, due to work on the castle of Boussac and the cost of his army. The French government was unable to compensate de Brosse for his service, being short on money itself. He resorted to selling off his crockery, silver, and his wife’s jewelry. He also freed the inhabitants of Boussac from his rule, in exchange for money.

In 1428, de Brosse took part in a rebellion, however it was soon squashed and the rebels locked up. However, since the king desperately needed generals, they were granted clemency.

De Brosse was among the French leaders who attempted to repel the English advance, however they failed, and in 1429 the English arrived at Orléans. Joan of Arc tried to get the king to send her, and with the urging of de Brosse, the king was convinced and sent Joan under the escort of de Brosse and Louis de Culant. The king also sent troops with them who joined the main French army. Under the leadership of Joan of Arc, the French won the Siege of Orléans. Because of his services, de Brosse was given a place of honor at the coronation of the king.

On 24 May 1430, Joan of Arc was captured. De Brosse tried to convince the king to save her without effect. He ruined himself trying to raise an army. He joined Xaintrailles and Lahire at the head of an army of 4,000. They liberated Compiegne, however Joan of Arc was no longer in the city. She had been moved to Rouen, where she was burned on 30 May 1431. De Brosse tried to avenge her by taking Rouen, however his plan failed, and he returned to Boussac.

== Later life and death ==
Upon his arrival at Boussac after his defeat, de Brosse learned of his wife’s death. Overwhelmed, he never left Boussac again for the rest of his life. He died in June 1433. Because of the great debts de Brosse had at the time of his death, his creditors threatened to have him excommunicated postmortem, and the dispersal of his mortal remains. The king however, raised enough money to pay off the debts, and de Brosse’s body was left in the abbey at Prébenoît.

== Marriage and children ==
He married on 20 August 1419 with Jeanne de Naillac, and had

- Jean II de Brosse, married on 18 June 1437 with Nicole de Châtillon
- Margaret, married with Germain de Vivonne, seigneur d'Anville
- Blanche, married with Jean de Roye, seigneur de Muret

== See also ==
- Hundred Years' War
- Charles VII
- Joan of Arc
- Siege of Orléans
- Saint-Benoît-du-Sault
- House of Rochechouart
- Château de Brosse
