= Canton of Saint-Doulchard =

Coordinates: 47°6′20″N 2°21′27″E

Saint-Doulchard
- Canton
- Interactive map of Saint-Doulchard
- Country: France
- Region: Centre-Val de Loire
- Department: Cher
- No. of communes: {{{nbcomm}}}
- Area: 69.50 km^{2} (26.83 sq mi)
- Population (2023): 15,291
  - Density: 220.0/km^{2} (569.8/sq mi)
- INSEE code: 18 13

The Canton of Saint-Doulchard is a canton situated in the Cher département and in the Centre-Val de Loire region of France. It has 15,095 inhabitants (2018).

== Geography ==
A suburban area of farming and light industry centred on the town of Saint-Doulchard, a northern suburb of Bourges.

The canton comprises 3 communes:

- La Chapelle-Saint-Ursin
- Marmagne
- Saint-Doulchard

== Population ==
Historical population
Year	Pop.	±% p.a.
2013	14,631	—
2018	15,095	+0.63%
Source: INSEE

== See also ==
- Arrondissements of the Cher department
- Cantons of the Cher department
- Communes of the Cher department
