= Loïc Jacquet =

France international rugby union player (born 1985)

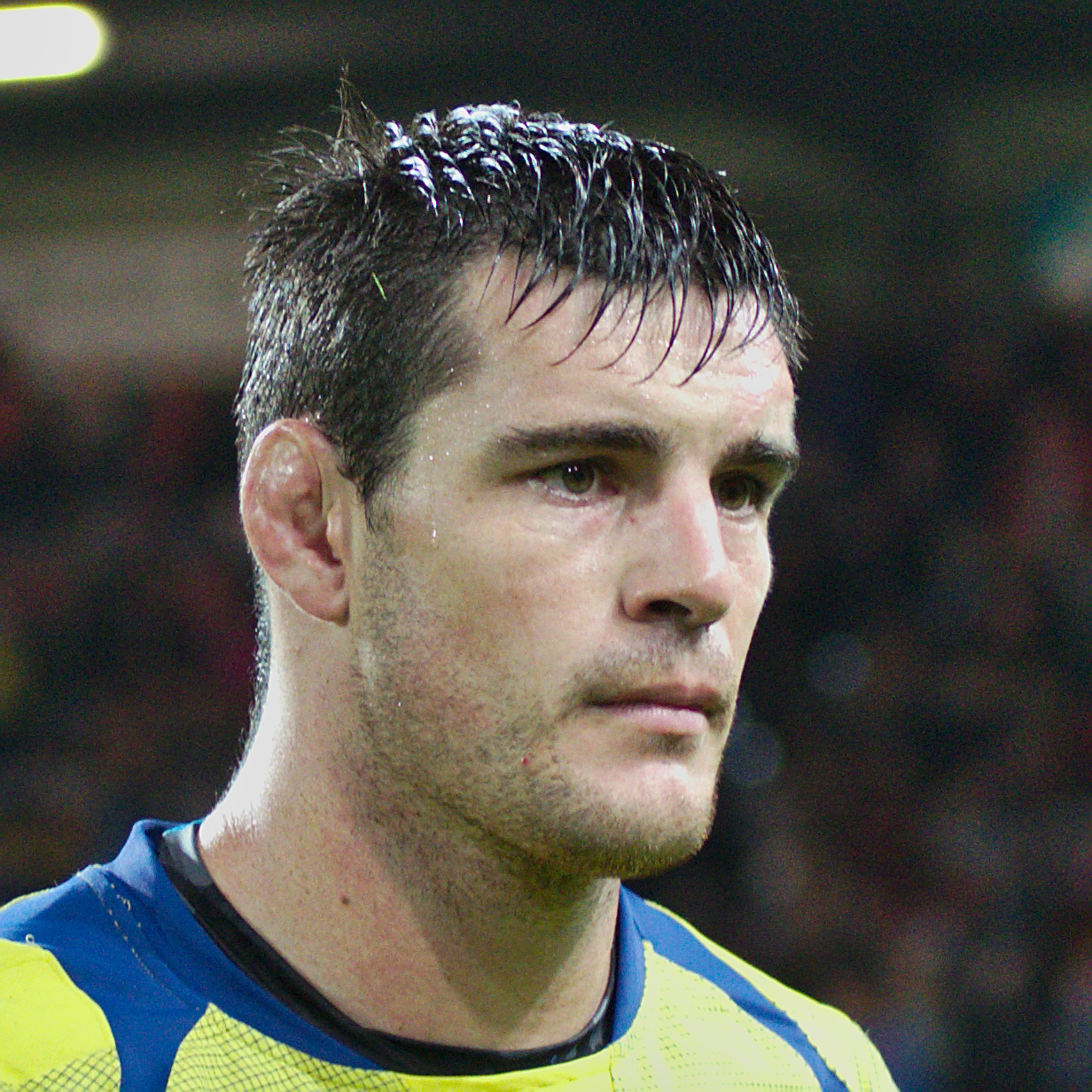
- Born: 31 March 1985 (age 41) Saint-Doulchard, France
- Height: 1.98 m (6 ft 6 in)
- Weight: 117 kg (258 lb; 18 st 6 lb)

Rugby union career
- Position: Lock
Senior career
Years	Team	Apps	(Points)
2004–2016	Clermont	231	(95)
2016–2022	Castres	133	(10)
International career
Years	Team	Apps	(Points)
2006–2008	France	4	(0)
- Correct as of 4 September 2008

Loïc Jacquet (born 31 March 1985 in Saint-Doulchard, Cher) is a French rugby union player who plays as a lock. He has so far spent his whole professional career in Clermont-Ferrand.

Jacquet was the captain of the French team that won the 2006 U21 World Cup. On 18 November 2006 he received his first cap against New Zealand. He played only one other game under Bernard Laporte but was called up by Marc Lièvremont for the first game of the 2008 Six Nations Championship against Scotland.

In 2010 he was selected in the French Barbarians squad to play Tonga on 26 November.

== Honours ==
(France) Clermont

- Top 14: 2009–10
- European Challenge Cup: 2006–07

(France) Castres

- Top 14: 2017–18
