= La Chapelle-Saint-Ursin =

- Commune
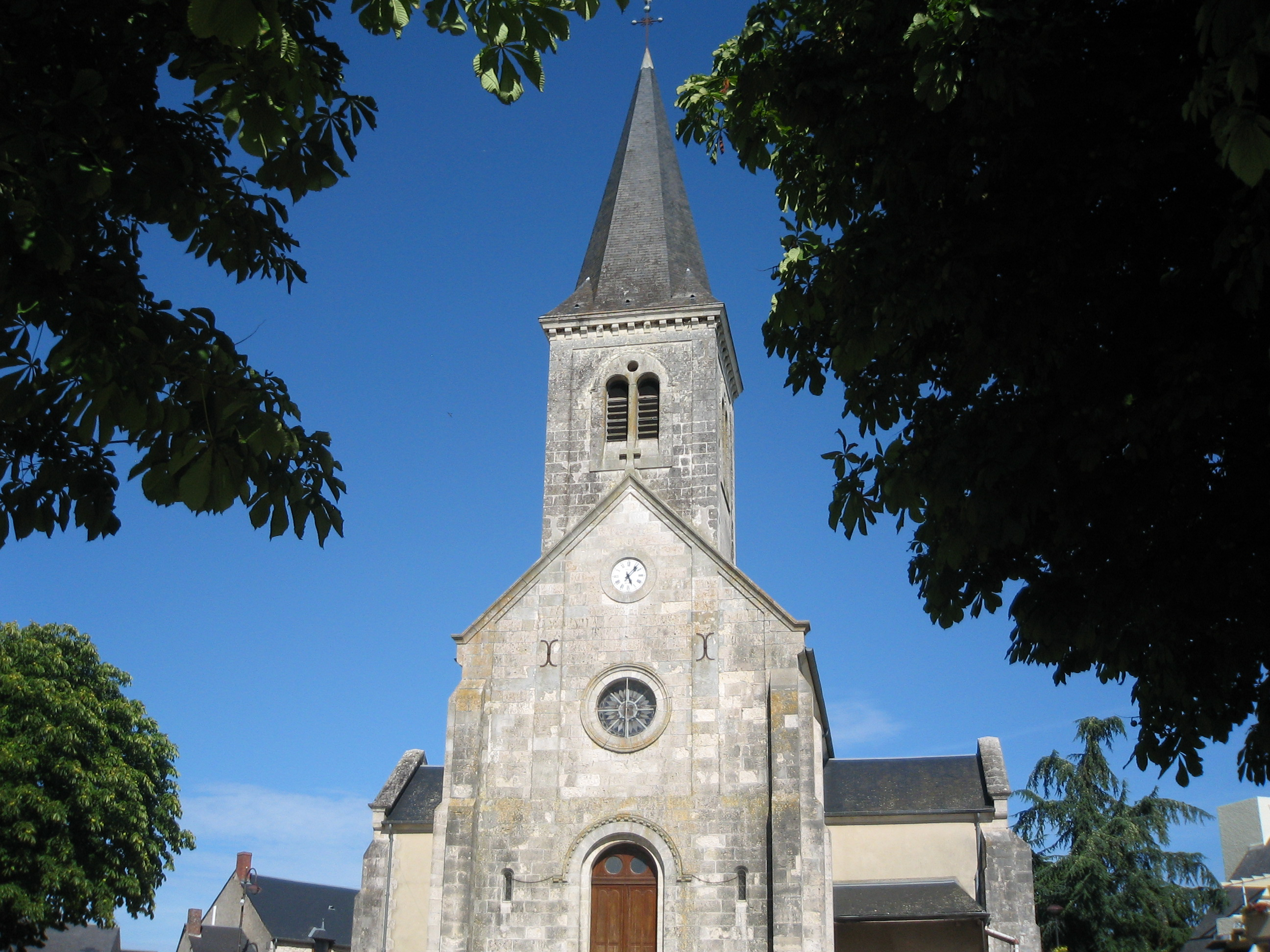
- The church in La Chapelle-Saint-Ursin

- Coat of arms
- Location of La Chapelle-Saint-Ursin
- Location within France Location within Centre-Val de Loire
- Coordinates: 47°03′47″N 2°19′32″E
- Country: France
- Region: Centre-Val de Loire
- Department: Cher
- Arrondissement: Bourges
- Canton: Saint-Doulchard
- Intercommunality: CA Bourges Plus

Government
  - Mayor (2020–2026): Yvon Beuchon
- Area^{1}: 7.83 km^{2} (3.02 sq mi)
- Highest elevation: 159 m (522 ft)
- Lowest elevation: 128 m (420 ft)
- Population (2023): 3,681
  - Density: 470/km^{2} (1,220/sq mi)
- Time zone: UTC+01:00 (CET)
  - Summer (DST): UTC+02:00 (CEST)
- INSEE/Postal code: 18050 /18570
- ^{1} French Land Register data, which excludes lakes, ponds, glaciers > 1 km^{2} (0.386 sq mi or 247 acres) and river estuaries.

La Chapelle-Saint-Ursin (French pronunciation: [la ʃapɛl sɛ̃.t‿yʁsɛ̃]) is a commune in the Cher department in the Centre-Val de Loire region of France.

== Geography ==
A small town of farming and light industry situated some 3 miles (4.8 km) southwest of Bourges at the junction of the D16 and the D107 roads. The A71 autoroute cuts across the middle of the commune’s territory.

== Population ==
Historical population
| Year | Pop. | ±% p.a. |
|---|---|---|
| 1968 | 1,326 | — |
| 1975 | 1,953 | +5.69% |
| 1982 | 2,430 | +3.17% |
| 1990 | 2,890 | +2.19% |
| 1999 | 3,193 | +1.11% |
| 2007 | 3,208 | +0.06% |
| 2012 | 3,289 | +0.50% |
| 2017 | 3,542 | +1.49% |
| 2023 | 3,681 | +0.64% |
Source: INSEE

== Sights ==
- The church of St. Ursin, dating from the twelfth century.

== See also ==
- Communes of the Cher department
