= Saint-Doulchard =

- Commune
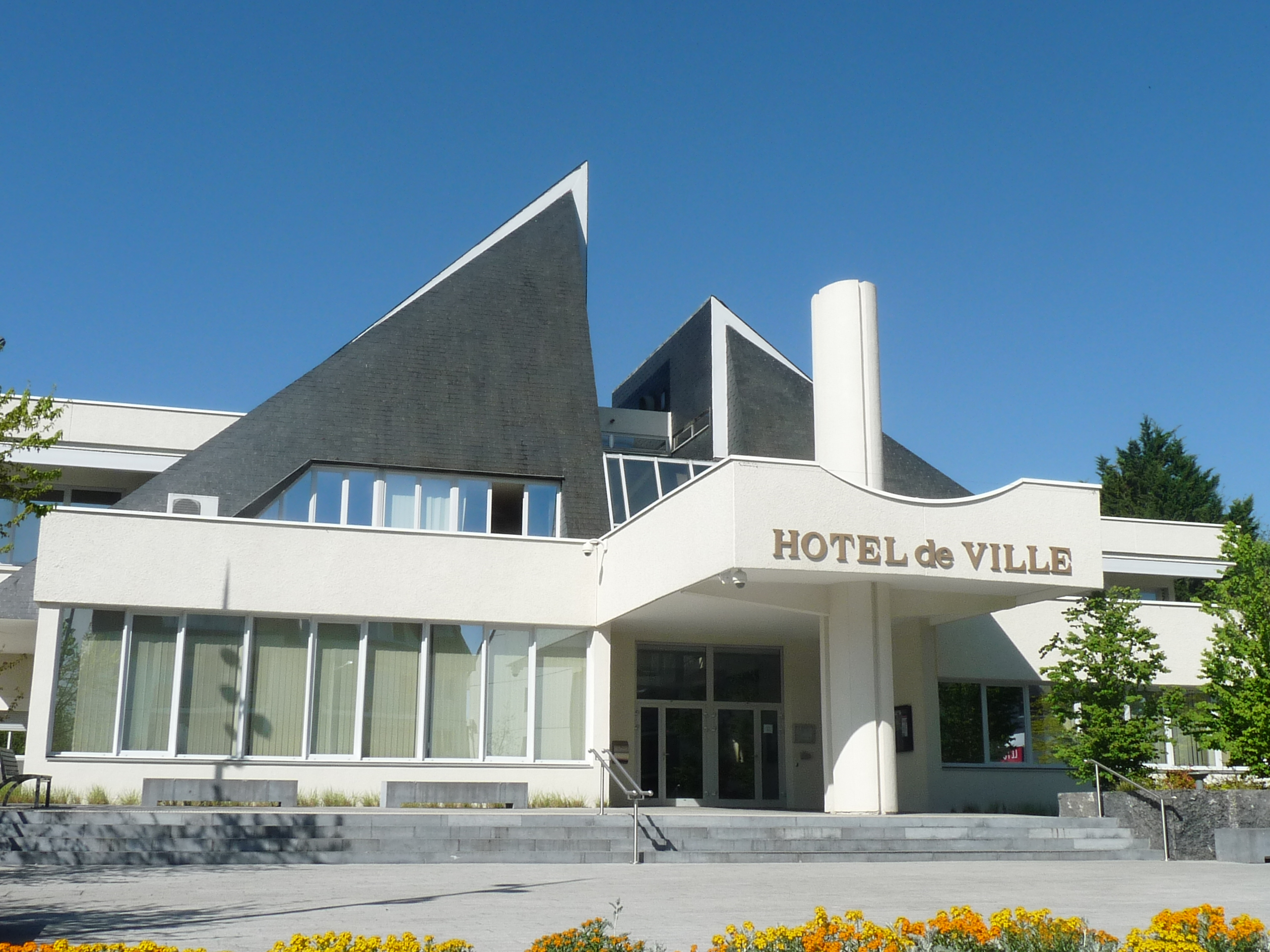
- Town hall
- Location of Saint-Doulchard
- Location within France Location within Centre-Val de Loire
- Coordinates: 47°06′20″N 2°21′27″E
- Country: France
- Region: Centre-Val de Loire
- Department: Cher
- Arrondissement: Bourges
- Canton: Saint-Doulchard
- Intercommunality: CA Bourges Plus

Government
  - Mayor (2020–2026): Richard Boudet
- Area^{1}: 24.01 km^{2} (9.27 sq mi)
- Highest elevation: 167 m (548 ft)
- Lowest elevation: 119 m (390 ft)
- Population (2023): 9,647
  - Density: 401.8/km^{2} (1,041/sq mi)
- Time zone: UTC+01:00 (CET)
  - Summer (DST): UTC+02:00 (CEST)
- INSEE/Postal code: 18205 /18230
- ^{1} French Land Register data, which excludes lakes, ponds, glaciers > 1 km^{2} (0.386 sq mi or 247 acres) and river estuaries.

Saint-Doulchard (French pronunciation: [sɛ̃ dulʃaʁ]) is a commune in the Cher department in the Centre-Val de Loire region of France along the banks of the Yèvre and the canal de Berry, immediately west of Bourges.

== Population ==
Historical population
Year	Pop.	±% p.a.
1968	5,274	—
1975	6,609	+3.28%
1982	7,928	+2.63%
1990	9,149	+1.81%
1999	9,018	−0.16%
2007	8,941	−0.11%
2012	9,242	+0.66%
2017	9,505	+0.56%
2023	9,647	+0.25%
Source: INSEE

== Notable people ==
- Philippe-Ernest Legrand, French Hellenist was born here in 1866.
- Bernard Diomède, French footballer was born here in 1974.
- William Bonnet, French racing cyclist was born here in 1982.
- Loïc Jacquet, French rugby union player was born here in 1985.
- Steven Palette, French racing driver was born here in 1989.
- Paul Lanchère, French racing driver was born here in 1991.
- Morgan Sanson, French footballer was born here in 1994.

== Twin town ==
Saint-Doulchard is twinned with:

- Darłowo, Poland

== See also ==
- Communes of the Cher department
