= Marmagne, Cher =

Marmagne
- Commune
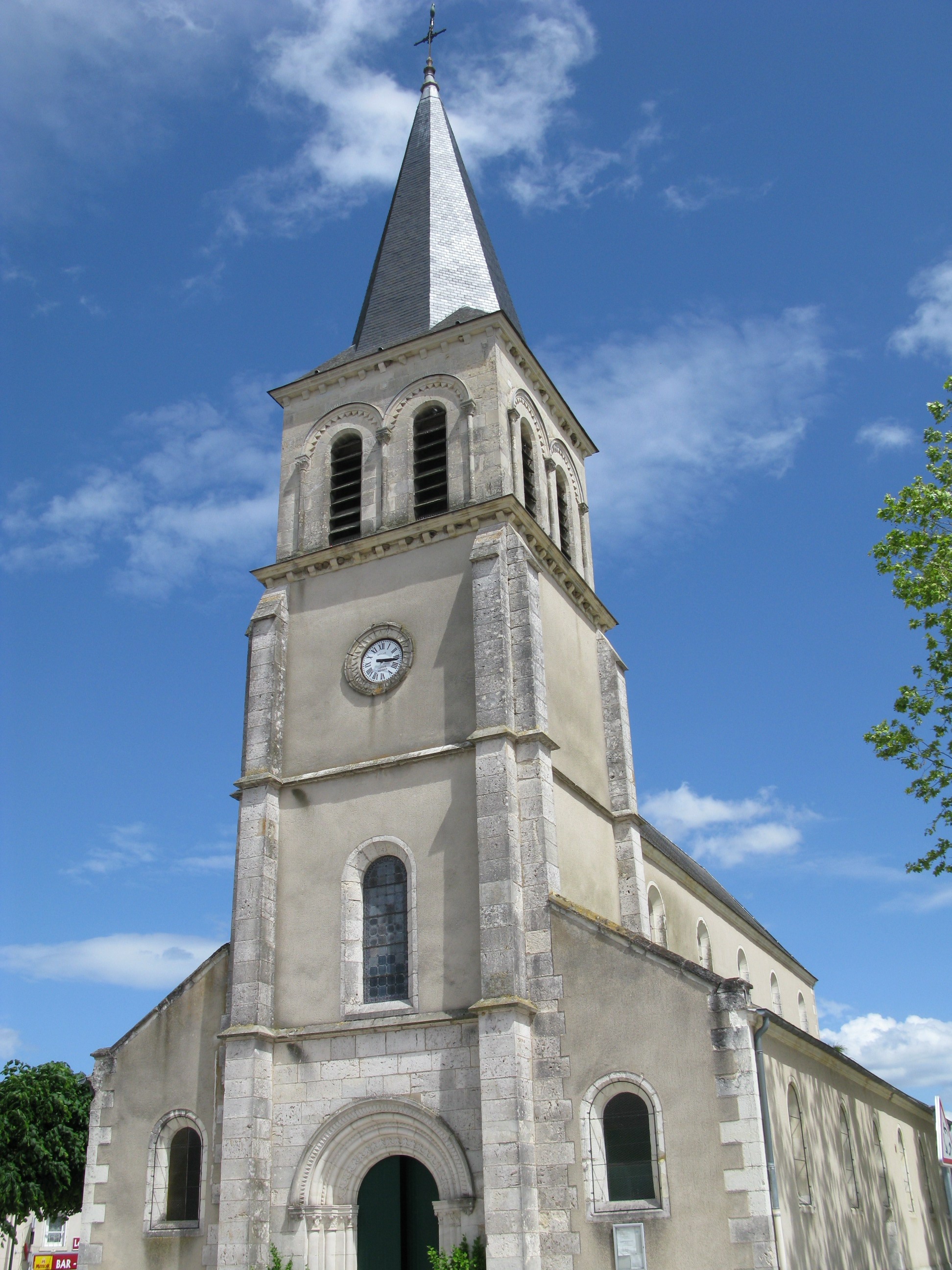
- The church in Marmagne
- Location of Marmagne
- Location within France Location within Centre-Val de Loire
- Coordinates: 47°06′08″N 2°17′05″E
- Country: France
- Region: Centre-Val de Loire
- Department: Cher
- Arrondissement: Bourges
- Canton: Saint-Doulchard
- Intercommunality: CA Bourges Plus

Government
  - Mayor (2020–2026): Bernard Dupérat
- Area^{1}: 37.66 km^{2} (14.54 sq mi)
- Elevation: 138 m (453 ft)
- Highest elevation: 149 m (489 ft)
- Lowest elevation: 113 m (371 ft)
- Population (2023): 1,963
  - Density: 52.12/km^{2} (135.0/sq mi)
- Time zone: UTC+01:00 (CET)
  - Summer (DST): UTC+02:00 (CEST)
- INSEE/Postal code: 18138 /18500
- ^{1} French Land Register data, which excludes lakes, ponds, glaciers > 1 km^{2} (0.386 sq mi or 247 acres) and river estuaries.

Marmagne (French pronunciation: [maʁmaɲ]) is a commune in the Cher department in the Centre-Val de Loire region of France.

== Geography ==
A farming area comprising a large village and several small hamlets situated by the banks of the Yèvre river and the canal de Berry, some 5 miles (8.0 km) west of Bourges at the junction of the D160, D214 and the D107 roads. The A71 autoroute cuts across the middle of the commune’s territory, which is also served by a TER railway.

== Population ==
Historical population
Year	Pop.	±% p.a.
1968	1,321	—
1975	1,684	+3.53%
1982	1,774	+0.75%
1990	1,908	+0.91%
1999	1,941	+0.19%
2007	1,996	+0.35%
2012	2,017	+0.21%
2017	1,960	−0.57%
2023	1,963	+0.03%
Source: INSEE

== Sights ==
- The church of St. Denis, dating from the thirteenth century.
- Several seventeenth-century buildings.
- The seventeenth-century chateau of Marmagne.
- The thirteenth-century abbey at Beauvoir.

== See also ==
- Communes of the Cher department
