= Battle of Taillebourg =

Medieval battle between France and England

- Part of the Saintonge War
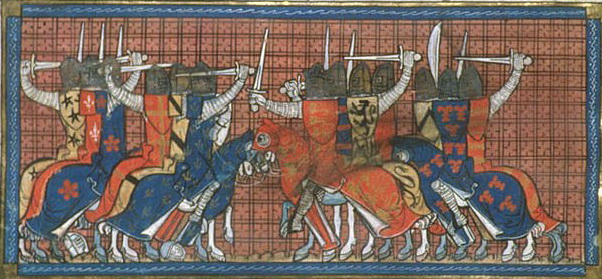
- Battle between the French (Louis IX) and the English (Henry III). (British Library, Royal 16 G VI f. 399)
Date	21–22 July 1242
Location	Taillebourg, Charente-Maritime (at the bridge over the Charente River) and later near Saintes, Charente-Maritime 45.83°N 0.65°W
Result	French victory

Belligerents
Kingdom of France	Kingdom of England and French allies

Commanders and leaders
Louis IX of France; Alphonse of Poitiers	Henry III of England; Richard of Cornwall; Hugh X of Lusignan

Strength
4,000 knights 20,000 infantry	1,600 knights 700 crossbowmen 20,000 infantry

Casualties and losses
Light	Heavy losses

The Battle of Taillebourg, a major medieval battle fought in July 1242, was the decisive engagement of the Saintonge War. It pitted a French Capetian army under the command of King Louis IX, also known as Saint Louis, and his younger brother Alphonse of Poitiers, against forces led by King Henry III of England, his brother Richard of Cornwall and their stepfather Hugh X of Lusignan.

The battle was fought on the bridge built over the river Charente, a point of strategic importance on the route between northern and southern France. Later it was fought near the city of Saintes. According to Charles Oman; the English and their allies were routed and forced to make peace but the King of France contented himself of leaving things as they had been before the war. The battle put down the Poitevin revolt and marked the end of Henry III's hopes of restoring the Angevin Empire, which had collapsed during his father's reign.

== Prelude ==
By the terms of his will, Louis VIII had given the title of Count of Poitou to his younger son Alphonse. In June 1241, Louis IX held a plenary court at Saumur in Anjou and announced that Alphonse, having come of age, was ready to come into possession. Many nobles from Aquitaine attended the court, among them Isabella of Angoulême and her husband, the Count of La Marche, Hugh de Lusignan.

After the meeting at Saumur, Louis went to Poitiers to install his brother ceremonially as the Count of Poitiers. The Lusignans were firmly against Capetian authority in the region. Isabella was particularly frustrated that her son, the Earl of Cornwall and brother to King Henry III of England, had not received the title at Poitiers. Shortly after his arrival at Poitiers, Louis learned that Hugh, Count of La Marche, had assembled an army at the nearby town of Lusignan. Talks between Louis and Alphonse and Hugh and Isabella did not resolve the dispute.

In April 1242, Louis assembled a force at Chinon that some contemporaries estimated at around 50,000 men (but credibly estimated at 25,000 men by modern historians) consisting of knights, men-at-arms, and foot soldiers. They captured a multitude of rebel castles. On 20 May, King Henry III of England arrived at Royan and joined the rebelling French nobles, forming an army that modern estimates number at around 30,000 men, and which varied in types of unit. The two kings exchanged letters, but these resolved nothing. The key battle would take place at Taillebourg, a strategic site near a key bridge over the Charente, which marked the boundary of territories under dispute.

== First phase ==
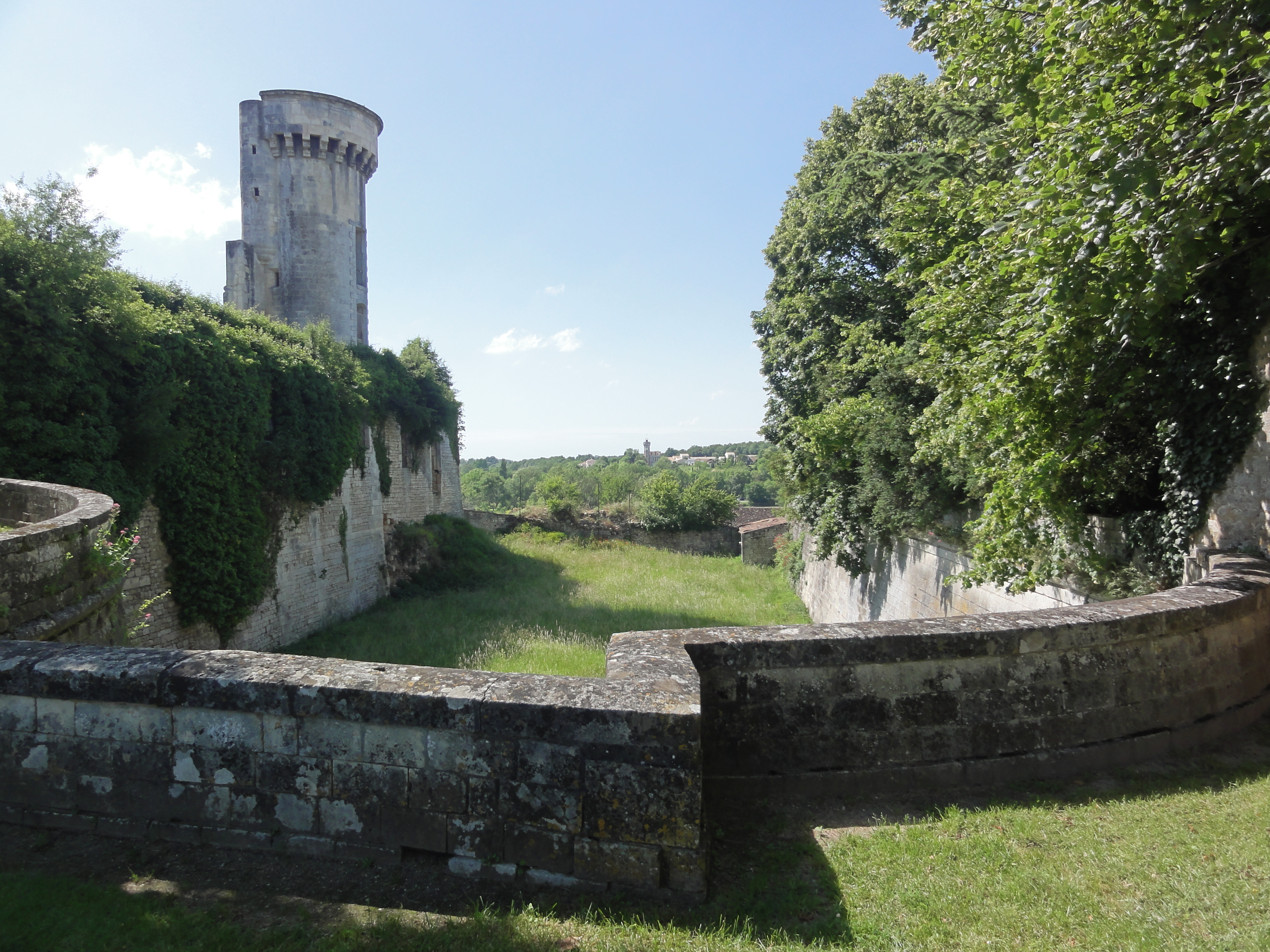
The Château de Taillebourg, with the tower overlooking the bridge on the Charente river.

On 21 July, the two armies faced each other across the bridge. The king of France and the count of Poitiers were installed in the Château de Taillebourg, which overlooked the bridge over the Charente, a strategic passage between Saint-Jean-d'Angély and Poitou in the north and between Saintes and Aquitaine in the South. The king of England and the count of La Marche set up their joint army on the opposing side of the river.

Determined to take the bridge, the English and the rebels initiated the engagement and assaulted the French positions. The battle ended in a massive cavalry charge by French knights, who sallied forth from the castle and harried their adversaries, who were compelled to flee to Saintes.

== Second phase ==
After the setback in the initial engagement, which permitted the French to control the strategic bridge, Henry and Hugh both individually fled to Saintes, and then to Gascony, leaving the Allied army leaderless. On 22 July, a field battle took place north of Saintes. A prolonged melee fight ensued and the English were once more thoroughly beaten. These two actions constituted the Battle of Taillebourg.

== The aftermath ==
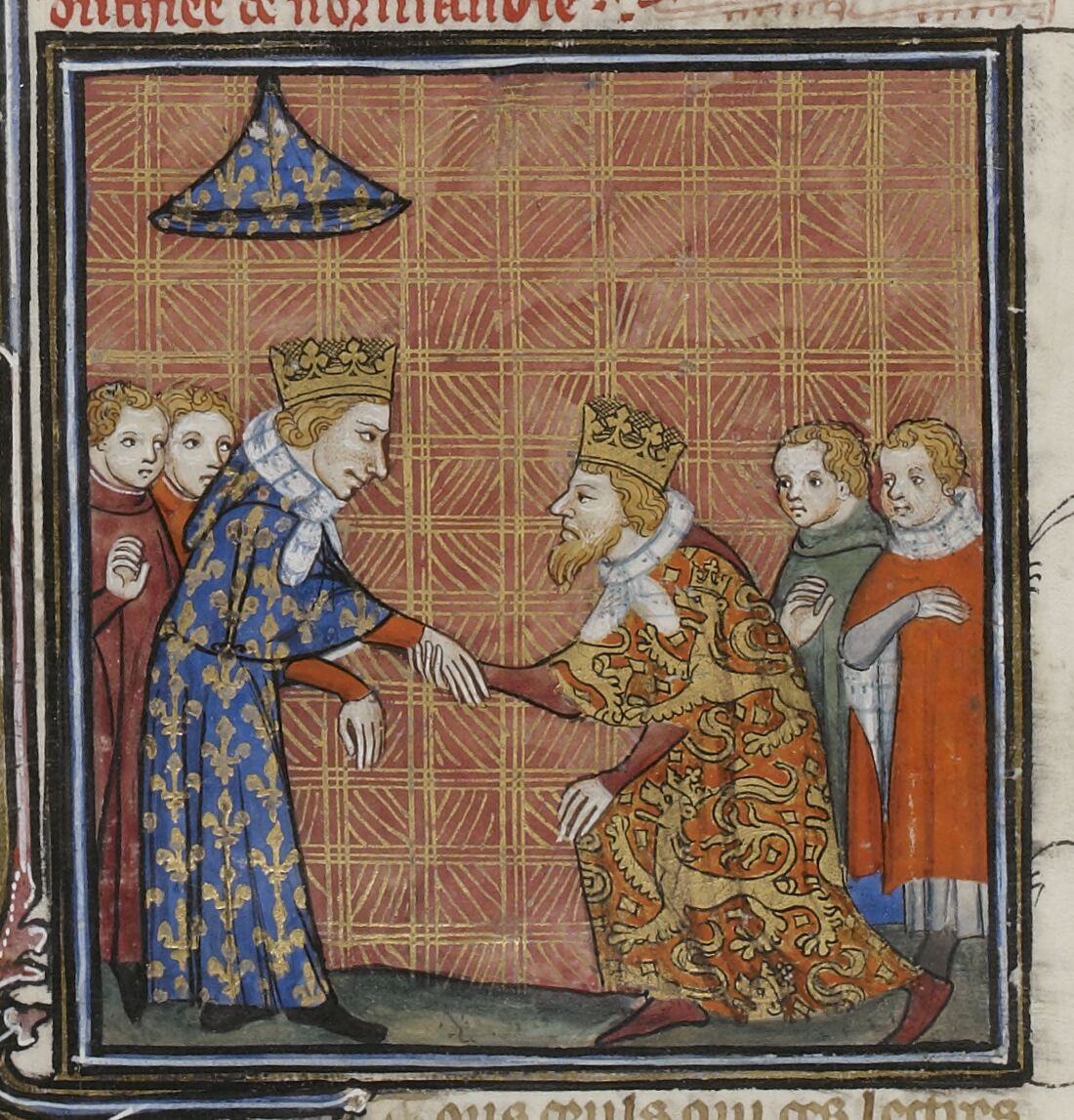
Henry III pays homage to Louis IX.

Louis continued to pursue the English troops, capturing many prisoners, until arriving upon the city of Saintes. After a short siege, the keys of the city were handed to Louis by the citizens. Henry tried one last time to prevent a complete takeover of his lands in Aquitaine and Gascony by organizing the blockade of La Rochelle by sea. However, the blockade failed along with the attempt to rebuild an army and build an alliance with other European monarchs. On January 1243, Henry sent a letter to Frederick II, Holy Roman Emperor, to whom he had made a request for an alliance earlier, announcing the end of his hopes for retaking his possessions in France. On 12 March, Henry was forced to ask Louis for a five-year truce.

The truce was signed at Pons, on 1 August. A more lasting peace was concluded at Paris, on 4 December 1259, amidst the threat of a second Baron's war in England. The king of France restored Guyenne to Henry as a noble gesture and to seek for further peace so that he could go on a crusade. Though if he had chosen, he might have forced Henry to surrender Bordeaux and Guyenne, the last possessions of the English crown beyond the seas.

The settlement of the feudal revolt was less advantageous for Hugh of Lusignan. His Poitevin castles were confiscated, rearmed, and sold by Alphonse of Poitiers. His daughter Isabel of Lusignan was married to his enemy Geoffrey of Rancon, lord of Gençay, in 1250, who rebuilt his castle with the dowry.

== Works of art ==
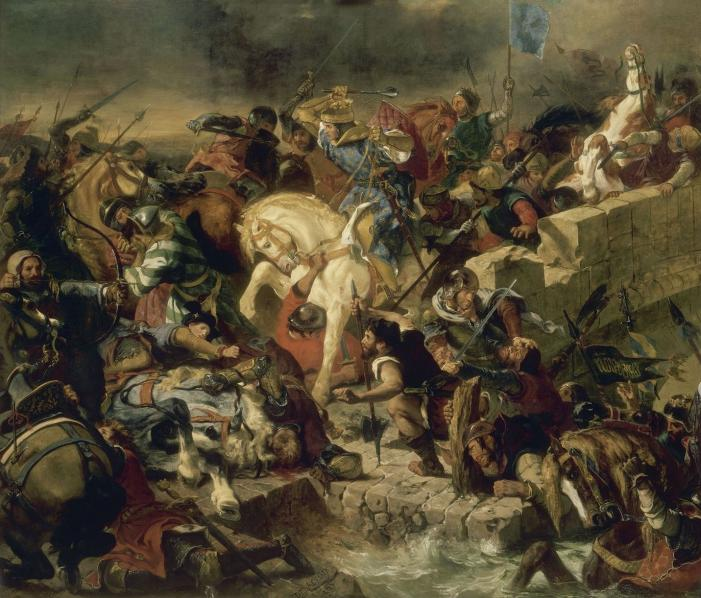
The Battle of Taillebourg, 21 July 1242, by Eugène Delacroix (Galerie des Batailles, 1837, Palace of Versailles)

The battle is the subject of an anonymous trouvère song, Molt lieement dirai mon serventois (RS 1835); it was written in support of Louis and his allies and mentions several historical figures by name.

Eugène Delacroix represented the battle in his tableau The Battle of Taillebourg, 21 July 1242, which was presented to the 'Salon' in 1837. In it he depicted all the spirit and ardour of the charge of the French knights.

== See also ==
- Capetian-Plantagenet rivalry
- Anglo-French war
- Saintonge War
- Louis IX of France

== Bibliography ==
- Le Goff, Jacques; Evan Gollrad, Gareth (Translator) (Translated from French edition (2009)). Saint Louis. Paris: University of Notre Dame Press. pp. 180–185, 301. ISBN 978-0268033811.
