= Château de Brosse =

Castle in Centre-Val de Loire, France

Coordinates: 46°24′55″N 1°19′13″E

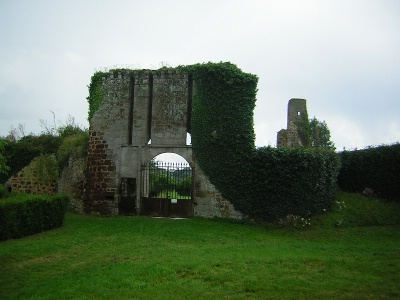
Château de Brosse

The Château de Brosse is a ruined castle in the commune of Chaillac, near Saint-Benoît-du-Sault in the Indre département of France.

== History ==
Located in the former province of Berry, the castle was built during the 10th century by the Viscount of Limoges, husband of Rothilde de Brosse.

The fortress, which belonged to the seigneurs of Brosse (now part of Chaillac), Chauvigny and Bourbon-Montpensier), was burned by the English during the Hundred Years' War.

== Architecture ==
All that remains today are the circular keep and its curtain wall (13th century) and their flanking towers, altered in the 15th century. The enceinte running along the promontory is from the end of the 13th century.

« ...
Tes ruines à Brosse ont la fierté de l'aigle
Vainement le débris près de la tombe gît
Brosse ! Brosse ! à ce nom tout un passé surgit
Un passé de bravoure où l'honneur est la règle
... »
(Extract from a poem by Émile Vinchon)

It has been listed as a monument historique since 1935 by the French Ministry of Culture.

== See also ==
- List of castles in France
