= Ainay-le-Vieil =

- Commune
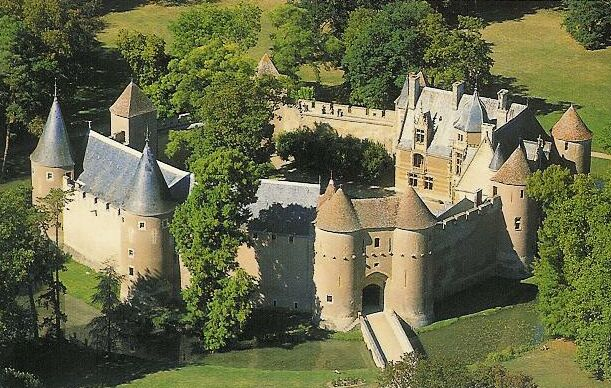
- Château d'Ainay-le-Vieil
- Location of Ainay-le-Vieil
- Location within France Location within Centre-Val de Loire
- Coordinates: 46°40′12″N 2°33′00″E
- Country: France
- Region: Centre-Val de Loire
- Department: Cher
- Arrondissement: Saint-Amand-Montrond
- Canton: Châteaumeillant
- Intercommunality: CC Berry Grand Sud

Government
  - Mayor (2020–2026): Marie Sartin
- Area^{1}: 14.00 km^{2} (5.41 sq mi)
- Elevation: 167 m (548 ft)
- Population (2023): 189
  - Density: 13.5/km^{2} (35.0/sq mi)
- Time zone: UTC+01:00 (CET)
  - Summer (DST): UTC+02:00 (CEST)
- INSEE/Postal code: 18002 /18200
- ^{1} French Land Register data, which excludes lakes, ponds, glaciers > 1 km^{2} (0.386 sq mi or 247 acres) and river estuaries.

Ainay-le-Vieil (French pronunciation: [ɛnɛ l(ə) vjɛj]; lit. 'Ainay-the-Old') is a rural commune in the Cher department in the Centre-Val de Loire region of France, bordered to the north and east by the river Cher, about 48 km (30 mi) south of Bourges. It is on the departmental border with Allier at Lételon (which is also the regional border with Auvergne-Rhône-Alpes).

== Population ==
Historical population
Year	Pop.	±% p.a.
1968	245	—
1975	193	−3.35%
1982	182	−0.83%
1990	170	−0.85%
1999	198	+1.71%
2007	203	+0.31%
2012	215	+1.16%
2017	186	−2.86%
2023	189	+0.27%
Source: INSEE

== Place of interest ==
- Château d'Ainay-le-Vieil, dating from the 14th century.

== See also ==
- Communes of the Cher department
