= Culan =

- Commune
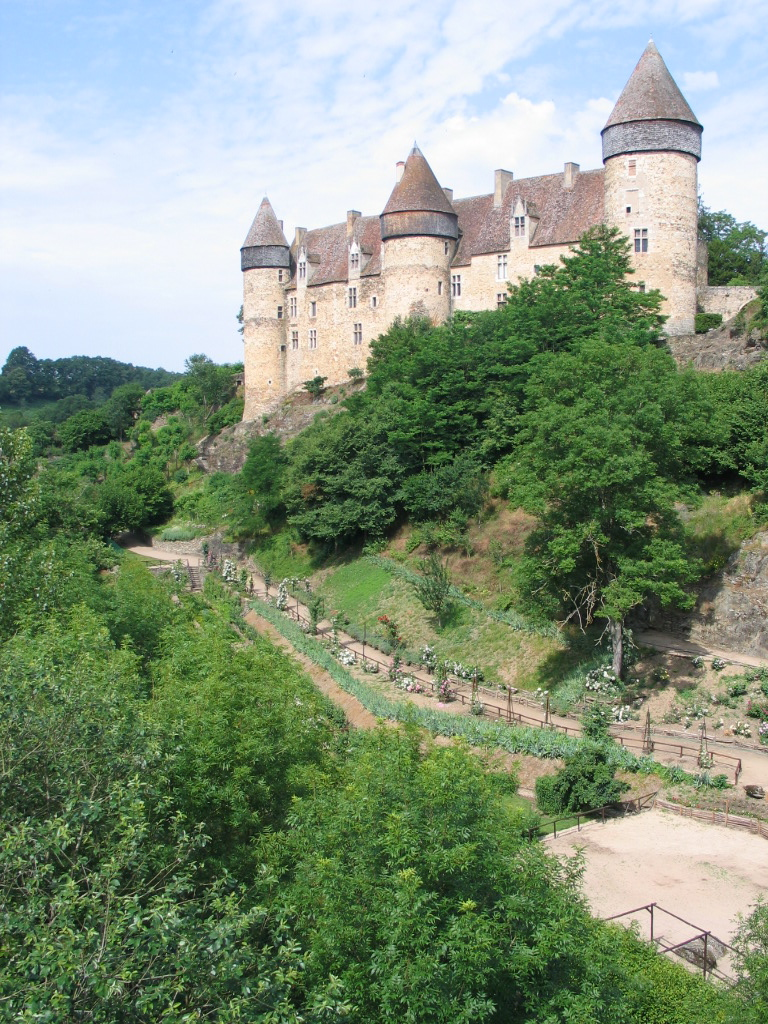
- The Château de Culan

- Coat of arms
- Location of Culan
- Location within France Location within Centre-Val de Loire
- Coordinates: 46°32′54″N 2°21′00″E
- Country: France
- Region: Centre-Val de Loire
- Department: Cher
- Arrondissement: Saint-Amand-Montrond
- Canton: Châteaumeillant

Government
  - Mayor (2020–2026): Nicolas Nauleau
- Area^{1}: 20.23 km^{2} (7.81 sq mi)
- Elevation: 270 m (890 ft)
- Highest elevation: 332 m (1,089 ft)
- Lowest elevation: 220 m (720 ft)
- Population (2023): 779
  - Density: 38.5/km^{2} (99.7/sq mi)
- Time zone: UTC+01:00 (CET)
  - Summer (DST): UTC+02:00 (CEST)
- INSEE/Postal code: 18083 /18270
- ^{1} French Land Register data, which excludes lakes, ponds, glaciers > 1 km^{2} (0.386 sq mi or 247 acres) and river estuaries.

Culan (French pronunciation: [kylɑ̃]) is a commune in the Cher département in the Centre-Val de Loire region of France.

It is best known for its 12th-15th century medieval castle, the Château de Culan, one of the oldest castles still occupied in the world. The castle has beautiful medieval gardens and it is open to visitors every day from Easter until November.

== Geography ==
The commune is a farming area comprising the village and a few hamlets situated by the banks of the river Arnon, in the south of the département some 35 miles (56 km) south of Bourges and at the junction of the D997 with the D943, D4 and D65 roads.

== Population ==
Historical population
Year	Pop.	±% p.a.
1968	1,310	—
1975	1,164	−1.67%
1982	1,055	−1.39%
1990	932	−1.54%
1999	822	−1.39%
2007	805	−0.26%
2012	791	−0.35%
2017	715	−2.00%
2023	779	+1.44%
Source: INSEE

== Sights ==
- The church of St. Vincent, dating from the seventeenth century
- The castle
- A watermill
- A nineteenth-century viaduct

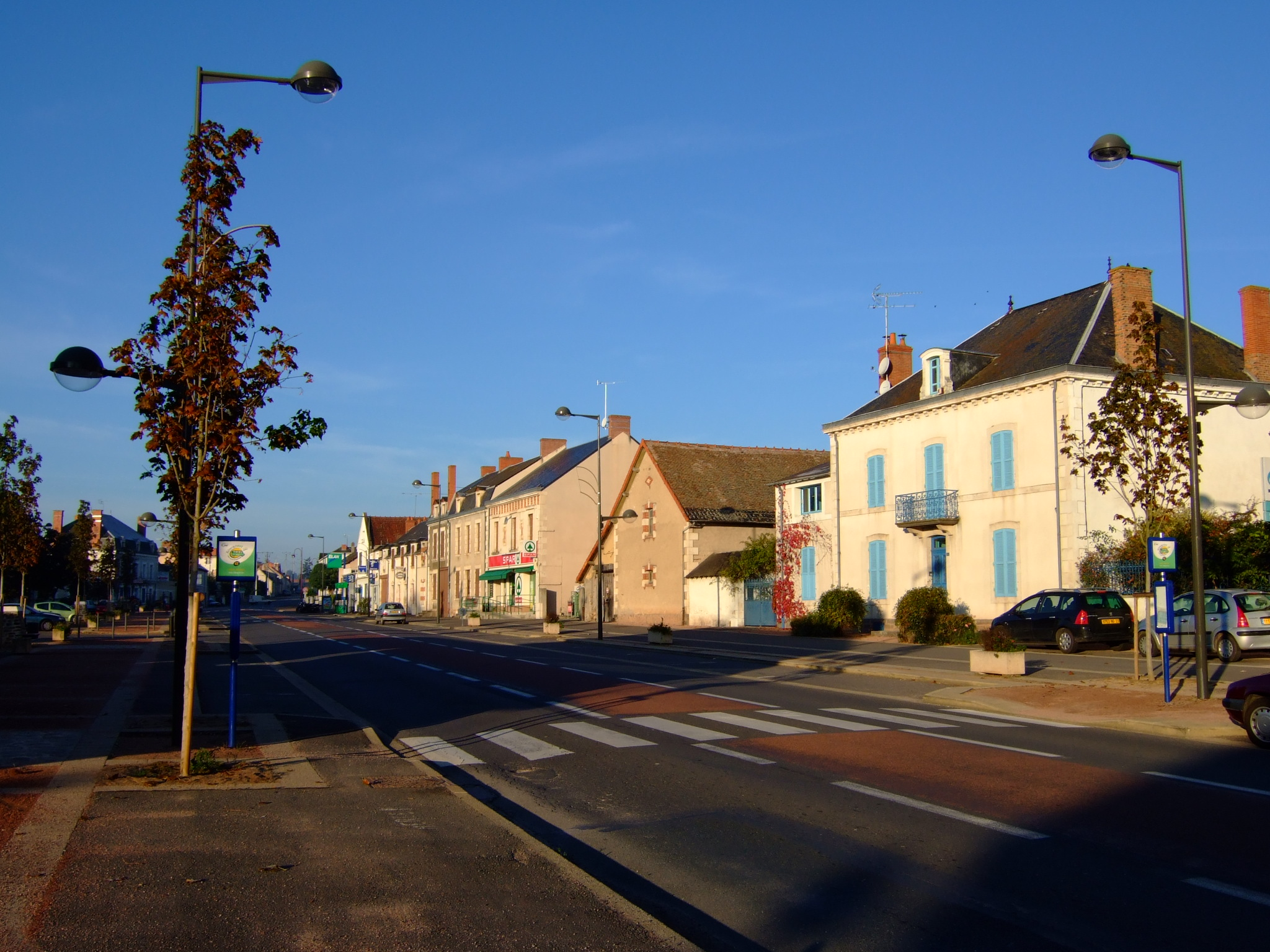
The village of Culan

== See also ==
- Château de Culan
- Communes of the Cher department
