= Taillebourg, Charente-Maritime =

Taillebourg
- Commune
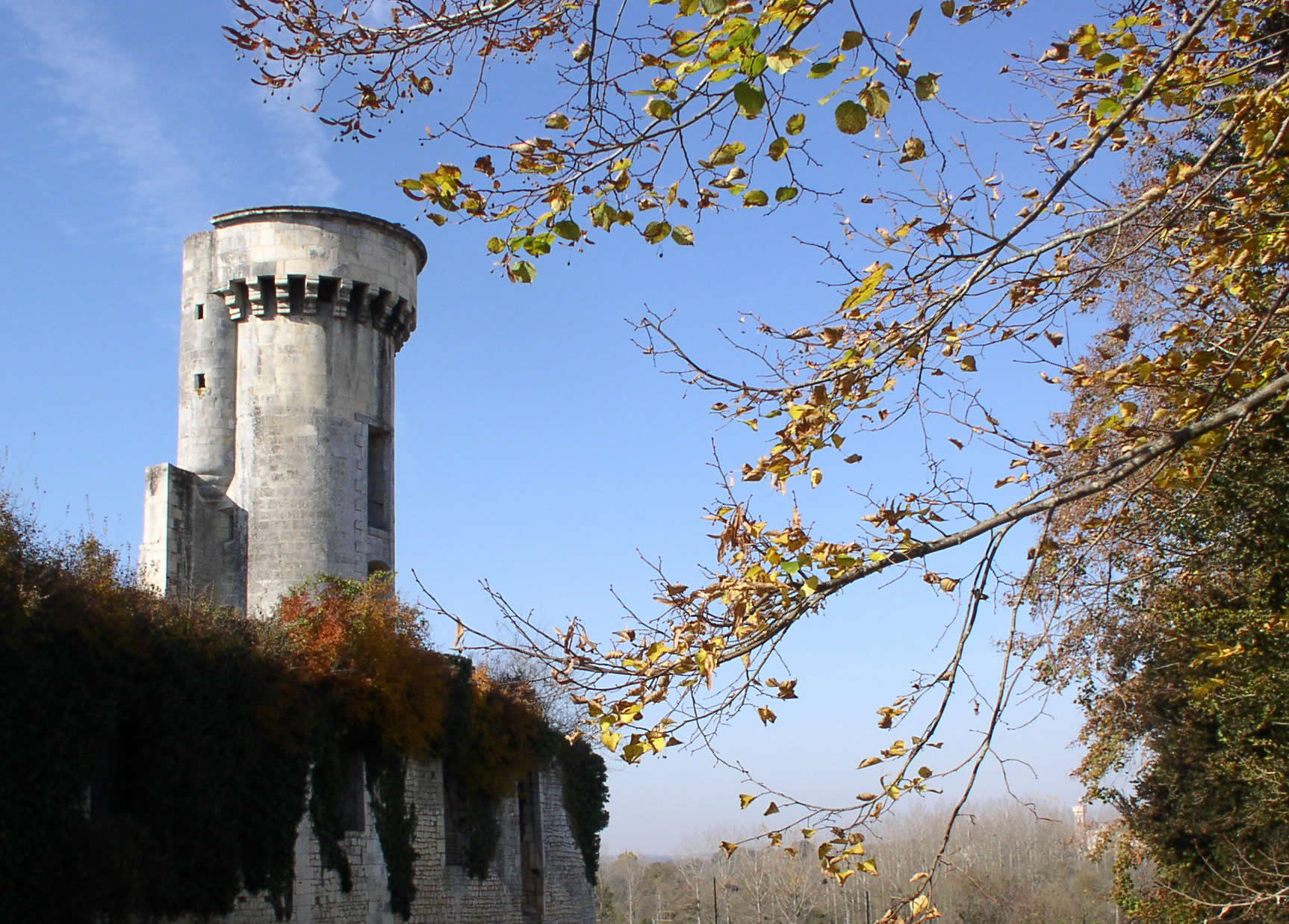
- Chateau

- Coat of arms
- Location of Taillebourg
- Location within France Location within Nouvelle-Aquitaine
- Coordinates: 45°50′15″N 0°38′32″W
- Country: France
- Region: Nouvelle-Aquitaine
- Department: Charente-Maritime
- Arrondissement: Saint-Jean-d'Angély
- Canton: Saint-Jean-d'Angély

Government
  - Mayor (2020–2026): Pierre Texier
- Area^{1}: 14.25 km^{2} (5.50 sq mi)
- Highest elevation: 63 m (207 ft)
- Lowest elevation: 2 m (6.6 ft)
- Population (2023): 794
  - Density: 55.7/km^{2} (144/sq mi)
- Time zone: UTC+01:00 (CET)
  - Summer (DST): UTC+02:00 (CEST)
- INSEE/Postal code: 17436 /17350
- ^{1} French Land Register data, which excludes lakes, ponds, glaciers > 1 km^{2} (0.386 sq mi or 247 acres) and river estuaries.

Taillebourg (French pronunciation: [tajbuʁ]) is a commune in the Charente-Maritime department in southwestern France.

It is built on a rock, overlooking the river Charente, 9 km downstream from Saintes.

The place was first mentioned as terra Talleburgi in 1267. It was the site of three battles that bear its name: Battle of Taillebourg, on account of its strategically important position as a river crossing. There was also a fourth action, a siege.

The château dominates the town and was the garrison of Louis IX (known as 'Saint Louis'), before the eponymous 1242 battle.

The ancient bridge over the Charente has since been destroyed but there is a long causeway, which spans the surrounding marshes and serves to keep the road open, even during times of flooding.

== Population ==
Historical population
Year	Pop.	±% p.a.
1968	681	—
1975	637	−0.95%
1982	626	−0.25%
1990	561	−1.36%
1999	600	+0.75%
2007	741	+2.67%
2012	753	+0.32%
2017	731	−0.59%
2023	794	+1.39%
Source: INSEE

== See also ==
- Communes of the Charente-Maritime department
