= Rochereau =

Rochereau is a surname. Notable people with the surname include:

- Henri Rochereau (1908–1999), French politician
- Hubert Rochereau (1896–1918), French soldier
- Tabu Ley Rochereau (1940–2013), Congolese musician

== See also ==
- Champigny en Rochereau, commune in Vienne, France

- Le Rochereau, former commune merged into the new one

- Denfert-Rochereau (disambiguation)
