= Bill Bradford (British Army officer) =

British Army officer (1912–1996)

Bill Bradford DSO MBE MC
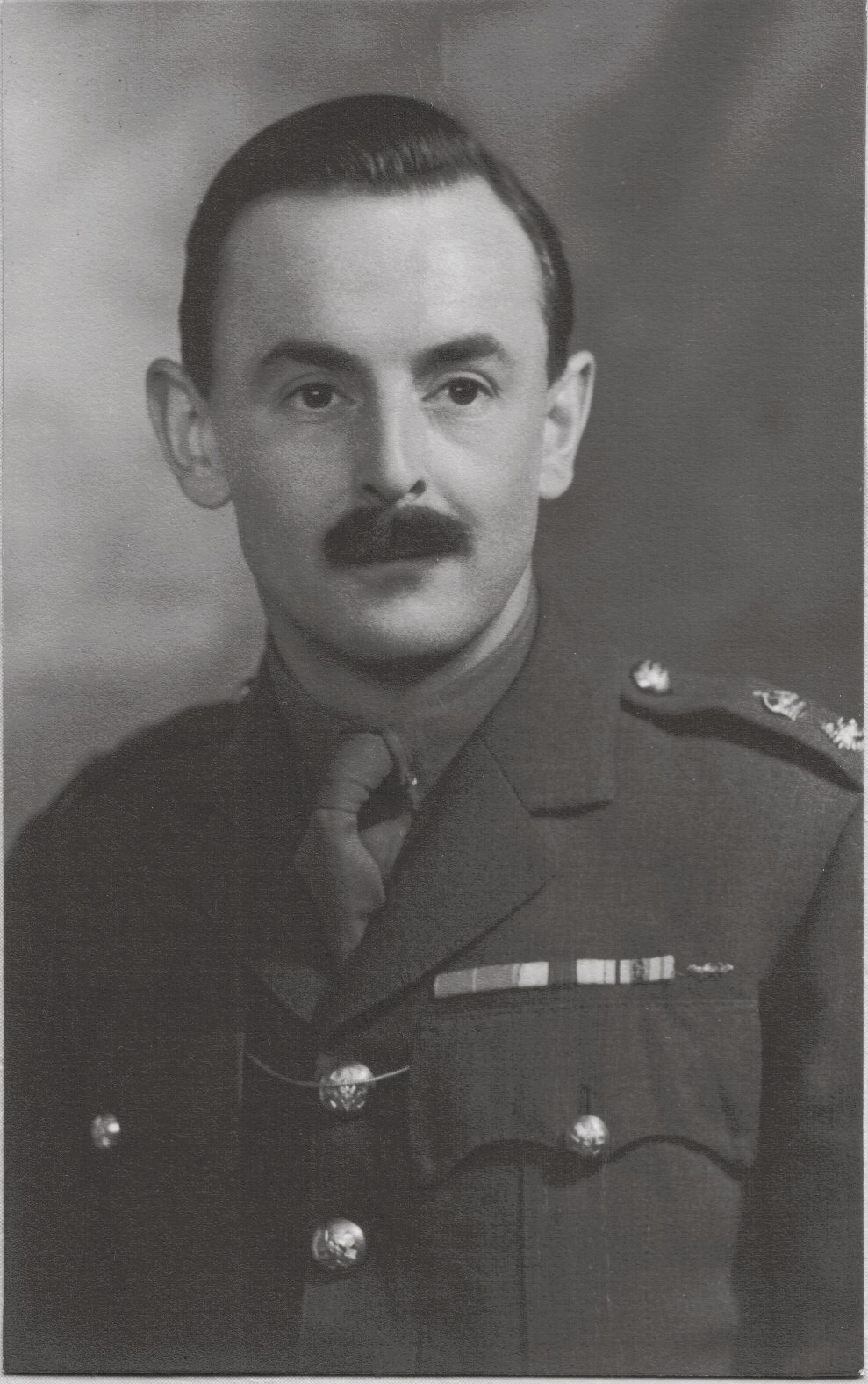
- B C Bradford, 1944
- Born: 15 October 1912; London, England
- Died: 4 March 1996 (aged 83)
- Burial place: Kincardine O'Neil, Aberdeenshire, Scotland
- Relatives: Edward Austen Knight (2nd Great Grandfather); Sir Edward Bradford (Grandfather); Sir Evelyn Bradford (Uncle)
- Military career
- Allegiance: United Kingdom
- Branch: British Army
- Service years: 1932–1959
- Rank: Brigadier
- Service number: 53741
- Unit: Black Watch
- Commands: 5th Battalion, Black Watch; 16th Battalion, Parachute Regiment; 2nd Battalion, Black Watch
- Conflicts: World War II
- Awards: Distinguished Service Order and Bar; Member of the Order of the British Empire; Military Cross

Brigadier Berenger Colborne Bradford DSO* MBE MC (15 October 1912 – 4 March 1996), known as Bill Bradford, was a British Army officer who served in the Black Watch from 1932 to 1959.

Bill Bradford was the second child and only son of Col. Edward Austen Bradford, DSO (1879–1958) and Margaret Louisa Hardy (1878–1972). Born in Chelsea, London he grew up at Empshott Lodge, Liss, Hampshire. Educated at Eton College he then spent a few months improving his French at a private ‘school’ run by Billy and Anne-Marie Gardnor-Beard at Chateau de Nanteuil, Huisseau-sur-Cochon, Blois, France before going to the Royal Military College at Sandhurst. He commissioned into the 2nd Bn. The Black Watch, Royal Highland Regiment (BW). In 1935 he joined a draft from 2nd BW to join 1st BW in India. In 1937 he was cross-posted to 1st BW which moved from India to Sudan before returning to Dover in March 1938.

On 1 January 1939 Bradford became Adjutant of 1st BW at a time when frantic preparations were starting as war seemed inevitable. After Germany invaded Poland on 1 September 1939 orders for General Mobilisation were received on 4th Sept. 1939 and on 5 October 1939 1st BW embarked for France aboard RMS Mona’s Queen (2,756 tons).

The Bn. helped prepare defences along the French/Belgian border and also served on the Maginot Line near Metz on two occasions. After the German Army advanced at Sedan on 10 May the Bn., which was now part of the 51st Highland Division which was under French Command and no longer part of the British Expeditionary Force, was moved to reinforce the French lines at the Somme. In early June 1940 the 51st fought a gallant moving rearguard action which ended with the encirclement of the division at St. Valery-en-Caux, in Picardy on 12 June 1940.

At that point Bradford, a 27 year-old Captain was effectively commanding HQ and two companies of 1st Bn Black Watch. He re-equipped his unit with materiel that had been abandoned by others and set up on a hill for all-round defence. This inevitably would have ended badly for them had not Gen. Erwin Rommel asked Bradford’s Brigade Major, Tom Rennie, whom Bradford knew well, to order him to surrender.

About 8,000 men of the 51st Highland Division were marched off in captivity on 12 June 1940. On 19 June 1940 Bradford made his escape near Billy-Berclau and, changing out of uniform into civilian clothes, walked towards the coast hoping to find a boat to take him across the English Channel. This was not to be and, as all refugees had to be some 15 km from the coast as he discovered when picked up by a German patrol. He talked his way out of their hands and headed inland and then south towards the only place he knew, Chateau de Nanteuil (see above). This journey involved numerous adventures including crossing the Somme, Seine and Loire rivers. Walking on quiet byways between 24 and 52 km per day while begging food and shelter from French farmers he arrived at Ch de Nanteuil on 7 July 1940 where he met Anne-Marie, now Comtesse de Bernard. They gave him a clean shirt, some money, soap, a little food and a bicycle with a very dodgy front tyre.

Bradford was the first of many escapers who were helped by de Bernard and members of the Sologne Resistance.

He set off towards the River Cher which was the demarcation line between Occupied and Free France. The bicycle tyre only lasted about 3 miles. Having crossed the Cher he was picked up and held by a French Army Unit at Chateauroux (10-12 July 1940) and then at the barracks of a Senegalese Bn. at Bélâbre (13-26 July 1940). He escaped again and moved south towards the Spanish border. Twice he crossed the high Pyrenees into Spain (4 & 8 August 1940) and twice he was arrested by the Spanish authorities and returned to France. He was now penniless and his boots had worn out. He turned himself in to the French authorities who locked him up in Depot 602, Ch. d'Envalette at Monferran-Saves. On 22 October he moved to Marseilles with Bob Hodges and Ian Garrow and immediately began with Garrow, Donald Caskie and Freddie Fitch to help organising the escape of the numerous servicemen in Marseilles most of whom spoke little if any French. As part of this effort Bradford stowed away on a ship to Algiers (29 October 1940) in the vain attempt to establish a repatriation route via North Africa. He was arrested and tortured by the Vichy authorities in Algiers. He did however later manage to move about and travelled to Oran and Tunis all the while sending home reports in a secret code within his correspondence to his parents who duly forwarded the information to MI9.

On 14 June 1941 he escaped from Algiers with a communist and a Jew in a small sailing boat and made the 700 mile voyage to Gibraltar despite none of them having much sailing expertise. He arrived in Gibraltar a year and two days after his first escape and having travelled some 4,795 miles of which 183 were while prisoner of the Germans. Bradford was awarded MBE for his escape but the citation was kept secret.

Bradford returned to the UK and after leave joined the 5th Bn. BW which was in the re-formed 51st Highland Division. Serving mostly as Brigade Major of 154 Brigade but sometimes as 2IC of 5th BW he fought the North African and Sicilian Campaigns. In June 1942 the Division sailed from ports in the Mersey, Severn and Clyde and after a 9-week voyage arrived in Egypt. The Division featured strongly in the 2nd Battle of El Alamein and in the subsequent 1,800 mile campaign to Tunis. During this campaign Bradford was awarded MC and Mentioned in Despatches for Distinguished Service.

The Sicilian campaign followed, after which Bradford was moved to General Staff (GSO1 HQ 2nd Army) and by the spring of 1944 he was Liaison Officer to General Omar Bradley, Commander of US 1st Army Group.

On D-Day he landed with the Americans at Omaha Beach and remained with Bradley until, on 26 July 1944 he took command of 5th Bn. Black Watch which he commanded until 5th Bn. was disbanded in April 1946. During the North-European Campaign Bradford was awarded DSO (1944) and Bar (1945) and was wounded several times.

Subsequently Bradford held the following positions and ranks. GSO1 HQ British Army of the Rhine 6th Feb. 1946; T/Lt.Col commanding 42 Primary Training Centre & Depot, The Black Watch, 5th Dec. 1946; Major 1st Jul. 1946; Bt. Lt. Col. 1947 Commanding 16th (Welsh) Bn. The Parachute Regt. (T.A.) 10th Oct. 1948; A.A. and Q.M.G. H.Q. 16th Airborne Division (T.A.) 9th Apr. 1951; Lt. Col. 22nd Mar. 1953; Commanding 2nd Bn. Black Watch, 2nd Apr. 1953; Col. 28th Jan. 1955; T/Brig. Commanding 153 (Highland) Infantry Brigade, 1957; retiring as Hon. Brigadier 12 June 1959.[i]

Bradford married Susan Vaughan-Lee, heiress of Kincardine Estate, on 30 October 1951 and they had four children, Robert (b.1952), Margaret (1953), Andrew (1955) and Ronald (1958). They lived at Kincardine O’Neil where he interested himself in running the estate; forestry, farming and fishing were his great interests. A major challenge he tackled was the reforestation of the estate following the fellings of timber during both world wars and the devastating gale of January 1953 which felled 95% of the estate’s 600 remaining mature woodland. It should be remembered that this was a time before chainsaws were around. Bradford set up a tree nursery, growing trees from seed collected from fir-cones, and by 1971 his team had re-planted 1,250,000 trees.

Bradford was diagnosed with Parkinson’s Disease in 1971 and showed his customary courage in dealing with that over the next quarter century. He fished and shot until his disabilities prevented that in the early 1990s and died in March 1996. He is buried at Kincardine Castle, Kincardine O’Neil, Aberdeenshire.

[i] The Officers of the Black Watch 1725-1986, 2nd Edition; RHQ The Black Watch (Royal Highland Regiment), p31; Samson Books Ltd.; ISBN 0 906304 08 3
