= Bradford baronets of South Audley Street (1902) =

Escutcheon of the Bradford baronets of South Audley Street

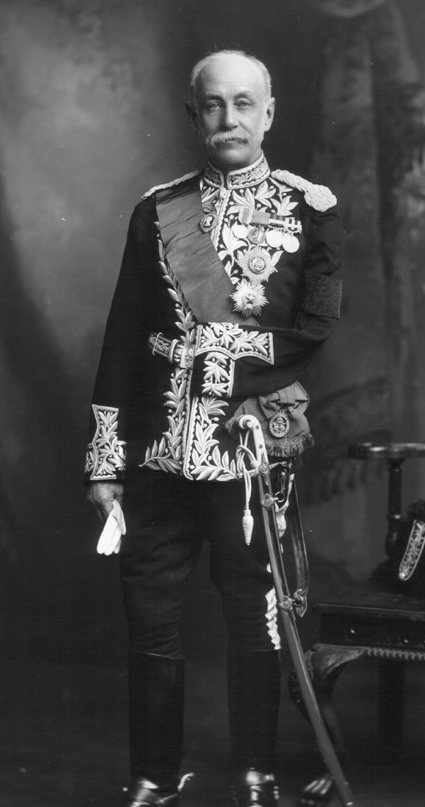
Sir Edward Bradford, 1st Baronet

The Bradford baronetcy, of South Audley Street in the City of Westminster in the County of London, was created in the Baronetage of the United Kingdom on 24 July 1902 for Edward Bradford. He was a colonel in the army and served as Commissioner of Police of the Metropolis from 1890 to 1903.

He was succeeded by his second but eldest surviving son, the 2nd Baronet. A colonel in the Seaforth Highlanders, he fought in the First World War, where he was killed in action in September 1914. The baronetcy descended in the direct line until the early death of his great-grandson, the 4th Baronet, in 1954. He was succeeded by his half-brother, recognised as the 5th Baronet, who does not use the title.

== Bradford baronets, of South Audley Street (1902) ==
- Sir Edward Ridley Colborne Bradford, 1st Baronet (1836–1911)
- Sir Evelyn Ridley Bradford, 2nd Baronet (1869–1914)
- Major Sir Edward Montagu Andrew Bradford, 3rd Baronet (1910–1952); killed in a riding accident.
- Sir John Ridley Evelyn Bradford, 4th Baronet (1941–1954); killed in a tractor accident.
- (Sir) Edward Alexander Slade Bradford, 5th Baronet (born 1952, does not use the title)

The heir presumptive to the baronetcy is the current holder's second cousin, Andrew Edward Hanning Bradford (born 1955).

== Notes ==
Baronetage of the United Kingdom
Preceded by Barlow baronets	Bradford baronets of South Audley Street; 24 July 1902	Succeeded by Dimsdale baronets
