= Sir Evelyn Bradford, 2nd Baronet =

English cricketer and British Army officer (1869–1914)

Sir Evelyn Bradford
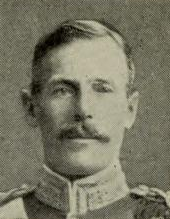

Personal information
- Full name: Evelyn Ridley Bradford
- Born: 16 April 1869; Goonah, Central Provinces, British India
- Died: 14 September 1914 (aged 45) near Bucy-le-Long, Picardy, France
- Batting: Right-handed
- Bowling: Right-arm fast
- Relatives: Sir Edward Bradford (father); Edward Knight (grandfather)

Domestic team information
- Years: Team
- 1895–1905: Hampshire

Career statistics
Competition	First-class
Matches	8
Runs scored	311
Batting average	25.91
100s/50s	1/1
Top score	102
Balls bowled	743
Wickets	20
Bowling average	16.40
5 wickets in innings	2
10 wickets in match	1
Best bowling	6/28
Catches/stumpings	5/–
- Source: Cricinfo, 16 January 2010

Sir Evelyn Ridley Bradford, 2nd Baronet (16 April 1869 – 14 September 1914) was an English cricketer and an officer in the British Army. Bradford was commissioned into the Seaforth Highlanders in 1888, his military career spanning the Mahdist War, Second Boer War and the First World War, with him being killed in action during the latter conflict. As a first-class cricketer, he played exclusively for Hampshire as an all-rounder on eight occasions between 1895 and 1905.

== Early life and military career ==
The son of Sir Edward Bradford, he was born in British India at Goonah in April 1869, where his father served as a political agent. He was educated in England at Eton College, before attending the Royal Military College, Sandhurst. From there, he was commissioned into the Seaforth Highlanders as a second lieutenant in August 1888. Promotion to lieutenant followed in June 1890, with a further promotion to captain coming in July 1895. Playing cricket for Aldershot Garrison against I Zingari in 1895, Bradford scored 248. In the same year, he made his debut in first-class cricket for Hampshire against Somerset at Southampton in the County Championship. The following season, he made three further first-class appearances in the County Championship; against Essex he took figures of 6 for 28 and 5 for 40 with his right-arm fast bowling, ending with match figures of 11 for 68.

Military duties then interrupted his participation in county cricket, with Bradford serving as part of the International Squadron which occupied Crete in 1897. The following year he took part in the Mahdist War under the command of Sir Herbert Kitchener, with Bradford being present at the Battles of Atbara and Khartoum, for which he was mentioned in despatches and received the Queen's Sudan Medal and the Khedive's Sudan Medal with two clasps. He returned to first-class cricket in 1899, playing two matches in the County Championship and one against the touring Australians. The legitimacy of his bowling action was called into question several times, resulting in him being no-balled, most notably by umpires Harry Pickett and Archibald White against the Australians. He was also no-balled by Alfred Smith in his second County Championship of 1899 against Leicestershire, but scored what would be his only first-class century in the match, with a score of 102 in Hampshire's second innings. In the army, he was appointed aide-de-camp to Sir Francis Grenfell, Governor of Malta in May 1899.

== Later military career and death ==
In January 1900, he was transferred back as a regular captain in the 2nd Battalion of his regiment, and early the following month embarked aboard the troopship SS Canada leaving Southampton for South Africa, where he was to serve in the Second Boer War. There, he was appointed to the staff as deputy-assistant adjutant-general in January 1902, and received a brevet promotion as major in the South African Honours list published in June 1902, with a note for future staff employment. The war ended that month, and Bradford returned to the United Kingdom on board the SS Syria two months later, arriving in Southampton in early September 1902, where he joined the 1st battalion of his regiment. He was appointed brigade major to the 3rd Infantry Brigade, part of the 2nd Divison, 1st Army Corps, based at Aldershot Command.

Bradford later played in a final first-class cricket for Hampshire in the 1905 County Championship against Surrey at Aldershot, where he was garrisoned at the time. In eight first-class matches as an all-rounder for Hampshire, he scored 311 runs at an average of 25.91. With the ball, he took 20 wickets at a bowling average of 16.40. By August 1908, he was commanding a company of gentlemen cadets at Sandhurst. Upon the death of his father in May 1911, Bradford succeeded him as the 2nd Baronet of the Bradford Baronets.

In May 1913, he was made a brevet lieutenant colonel, with him gaining the rank in full the following month. He continued to play army cricket up to 1913, scoring 251 for Shorncliffe Garrison against Folkestone Cricket Club. Bradford served in the First World War as commander of the 2nd Battalion of his regiment, which formed part of the 10th Infantry Brigade. He was killed in action during the First Battle of the Aisne by shrapnel from a shell impact near Bucy-le-Long in Picardy on 14 September 1914; his body was recovered and subsequently buried at the Crouy-Vauxrot French National Cemetery. He was later posthumously mentioned in despatches in December 1914. Upon his death, he was succeeded to the Baronetcy by his son, Edward, who was just four years old. Bradford's maternal grandfather was Edward Knight, an early Hampshire cricketer, who was related to a long line of cricketing families including the Jenners, Normans, Nepeans, Barnards, Bonham Carters, Wathens, and Dykes. His nephew was Bill Bradford, who was an officer in the Black Watch.

Baronetage of the United Kingdom
Preceded by Sir Edward Bradford	Baronet (of South Audley Street); 1911–1914	Succeeded by Sir Edward Bradford
