= Kincardine Castle, Royal Deeside =

Victorian country house in Royal Deeside, Scotland

Coordinates: 57°05′23″N 2°39′33″W

Kincardine Castle
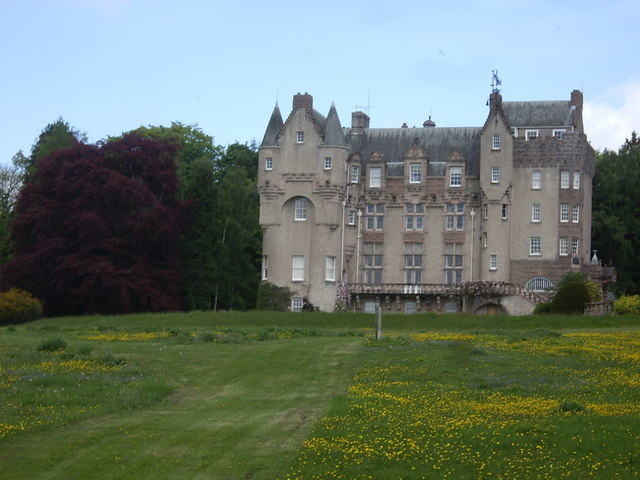
- Kincardine Castle in 2010
- Interactive map of the Kincardine Castle area

General information
- Location: Scotland

Kincardine Castle is a Victorian country house in Royal Deeside, Scotland. Formerly known as Kincardine House, it is the private home of the Bradford family (indirect descendants of Sir Edward Bradford) and also operates as a hospitality venue. The house sits 1 kilometre (0.62 mi) north-east of the village of Kincardine O'Neil, and 8 kilometres (5.0 mi) east of Aboyne on the north side of the River Dee, Aberdeenshire.

== History ==
The house was built for Mary Pickering on the site of, and incorporating part of, an earlier building called Kincardine Lodge, dating from around 1780.

== Architecture ==
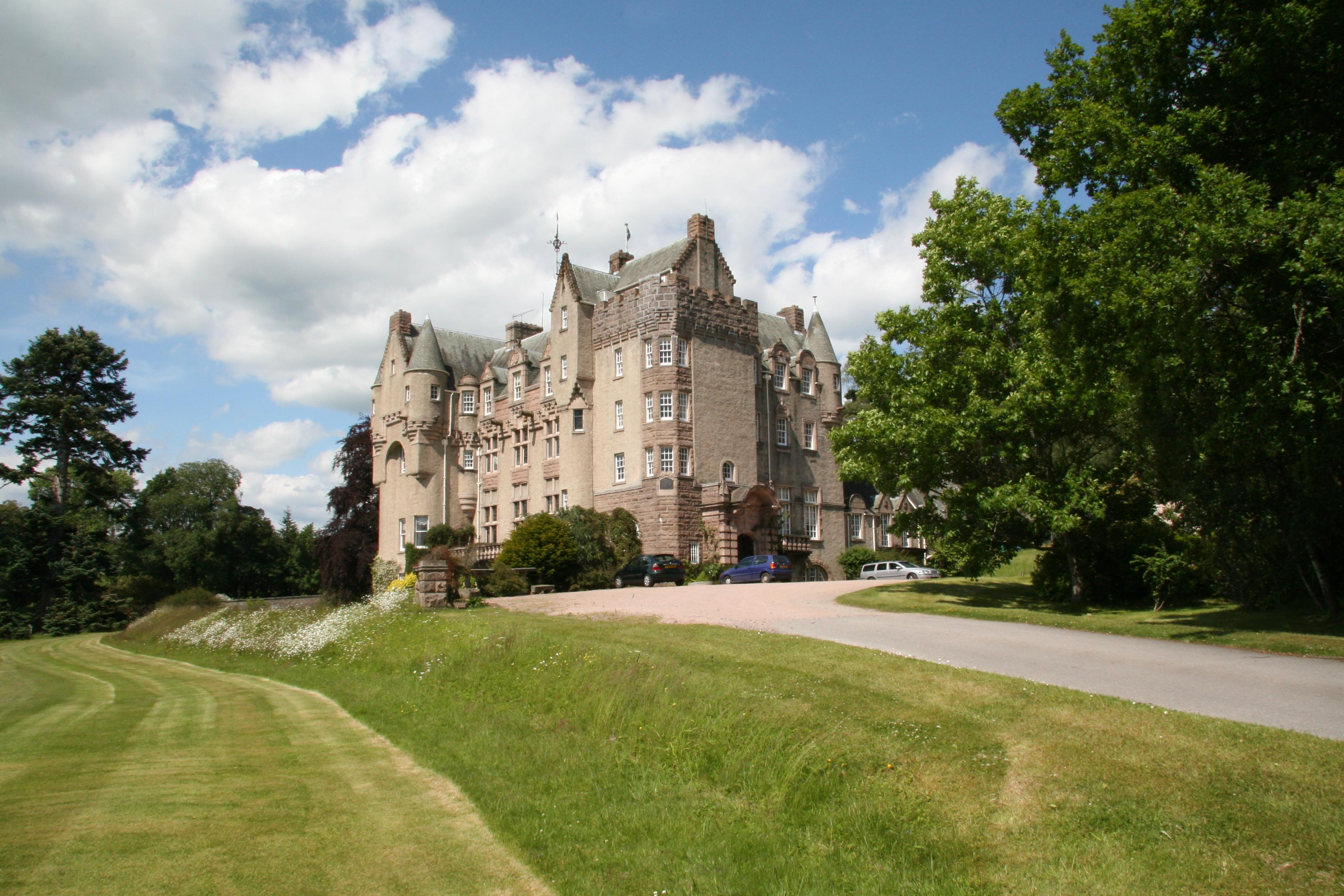
Kincardine Castle

The castle was built between 1894 and 1896 based on Scots Baronial designs by Niven and Wigglesworth of London. David Barclay Niven trained in Dundee and moved to the office of Sir Aston Webb in London where he became principal designer. At the time, Webb was working on designs for the Victoria and Albert Museum. Webb later went on to design notable London buildings including Admiralty Arch, The Mall and the principal facade of Buckingham Palace. Herbert Hardy Wigglesworth trained in Aberdeen under Alexander Marshall Mackenzie before moving to the London office of Ernest George and Peto. The architects set up in business together and Kincardine Castle was their first major commission. They were influenced by the Arts and Crafts movement and this shows in the design which incorporates features from five centuries of building styles.

The entrance tower hints back to the 14th century keep with its plain rendered walls, battlements and cap house. There is a high-level door, half hidden by the ornate portico. The addition of windows in the south-west face of this tower in the 1930s somewhat detracted from the intended effect. Another tower consists of twin drum towers corbelled to the square and back again to round turrets and these twin towers are linked with an arch - the whole is similar in effect to the Seaton Tower at Fyvie Castle from 1599. While the building has five circular turrets, it also has one square turret very similar in style to those at Crathes Castle (late 16th century). Much of the remainder of the building reflects fairly standard Scottish Baronial architecture from 17th and 18th centuries. The rear elevation of the building is the plainest and more akin to the work of Charles Rennie Macintosh though the architects retained crow-stepped gables and as a result the property doesn't leak as disastrously as Macintosh's Hill House. It is a category B listed building.

Around 1900, T. H. Mawson discussed the possibility of planning gardens, but no plans were produced. At the heart of a 3,000-acre (1,200 ha) estate, the castle is not open to the public, but serves as a venue for meetings, private dining, marquee events and weddings. There are extensive private gardens including a Walled Garden and a Woodland Garden.

In 2016, Kincardine Castle featured on an episode of Oighreachdan na h-Alba/Great Estates, a BBC Alba documentary series taking an in-depth look at the workings of country estates.
