= Kincardine O'Neil =

Village in Aberdeenshire, Scotland

Coordinates: 57.086934°N 2.673993°W

Kincardine O'Neil: Scottish Gaelic: Cinn Chàrdainn
- Location within Aberdeenshire
- Population: 338 (2010)
- OS grid reference: NO592997
- Council area: Aberdeenshire
- Lieutenancy area: Aberdeenshire
- Country: Scotland
- Sovereign state: United Kingdom
- Post town: Aboyne
- Postcode district: AB34
- Dialling code: 013398
- Police: Scotland
- Fire: Scottish
- Ambulance: Scottish
- UK Parliament: West Aberdeenshire and Kincardine
- Scottish Parliament: Aberdeenshire West

Kincardine O'Neil (Scottish Gaelic: Cinn Chàrdainn, Scots: Kinker) is a village in Aberdeenshire, Scotland. It is situated between the towns of Banchory and Aboyne approximately 25 miles (40 km) west of Aberdeen on the north bank of the River Dee.

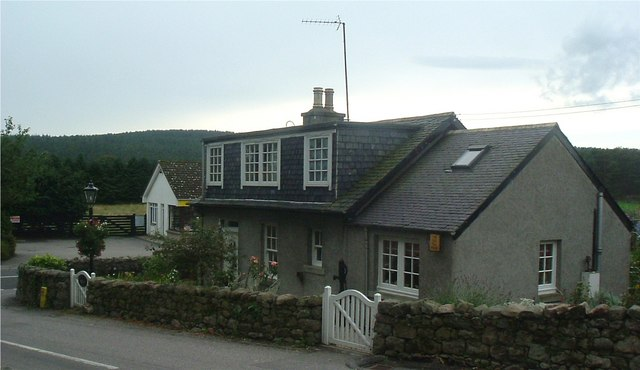
The Old Toll House at Kincardine O'Neil

== Etymology ==
The village was formerly known as Eaglais Iarach (Church of St Irchard/Erchard) in Scots Gaelic.

The O'Neil suffix is likely to originate from the ancient Barony of Onele/O'Neill which was gifted to Donnchadh IV, Earl of Fife by Robert the Bruce in 1315.

== Area history ==
Since ancient times there was a crossing of the Dee River at Kincardine O'Neil. Locations of the Dee crossings along with alignment of ancient trackways formed a major impetus for location of early castles and settlements. In the vicinity of Kincardine O'Neil the Middle Ages trackways to the south had a particular influence on development in and around Kincardine O'Neil and Aboyne Castle.

Saint Irchard, a medieval bishop of the Picts, was born in Kincardine O'Neil.

In the 19th century, the Deeside Railway bypassed the village, impeding the expansion of the settlement, unlike towns nearby. By 1895 the population of Kincardine O'Neil exceeded 200. Most of the extant buildings were built in the 19th century.

The village was designated a conservation area in 1983 and subsequently granted 'outstanding' status in 1995.

== Amenities ==
Kincardine O'Neil is home to a number of shops and services including a traditional village store and post office. The village hall, bowling green and playing field are to the west end of the settlement. There is a curling pond behind the north side of the main street. There is a Scottish Episcopal Church and a primary school. Public toilets are maintained by the local community. The Deeside Way passes through the village.

== People associated with Kincardine O'Neil ==
- John Henry Anderson (1814–1874)
- Margaret Bane (1542–1597)
- Bill Bradford (British Army officer) (1912–1996)
- Carey Fraser (1896-1979) WW1 Heroine
- James Grant Duff (1789–1858)
- David Dumbreck (1805–1876)
- Alan Durward (died c.1274)
- Irchard (lived 5th or 6th century)
- Peter Milne (musician) (1824–March 1908)
- Thomas Reid (1710–1796)
- Alexander Ross (poet) (1699–1784)

== Sister cities ==
- Thun-Saint-Martin, France

== See also ==
- Kincardine Castle, Royal Deeside
- Kincardine O'Neil Hospital, Aberdeenshire

== External sources ==
- Kincardine O'Neil Homepage
