= Irchard =

Scottish missionary, saint and bishop

Saint Irchard
- Born: Kincardine O'Neil, Aberdeenshire, Scotland
- Residence: Glenmoriston
- Feast: 24 August

Saint Irchard (Note: William Mackay explained that Merchard is Mo Erhard, signifying my Erhard. The old Celts of Ireland and Scotland had a habit of placing the pronoun mo (my) before the names of their favorite saints as a term of affection... The name Erchard is in ancient writings variously written:– Erchard, Erchad, Erchan, Erthadus, Erchard, Erchadus.) (or Erchard, Erthad, Merchard, Yarcard, Yrchard) was a Scottish missionary and bishop.

== Barrett's account ==
According to Dom Michael Barrett (1848-1924), a monk of the Order of Saint Benedict at St. Benedict's Abbey, Fort Augustus, Scotland, in his The Calendar of Scottish Saints (1919),

St. Yrchard or Merchard, Bishop, 5th or 6th century

This saint was born of pagan parents in the district of Kincardine-O’Neil, Aberdeenshire.

In his early youth he embraced the Christian Faith, and was ordained priest by Saint Ternan, who associated the young man with himself in his missionary labours. In later life he journeyed to Rome, and was there consecrated bishop. Returning to Scotland he ended his days in Aberdeenshire. At Kincardine-O’Neil a church was erected over the spot where the chariot which was conveying his remains to burial was miraculously stopped. A fair was formerly held there annually on Saint Merchard’s feast and during the octave.

One of the saint’s churches was in Glenmoriston. The ancient burial ground which adjoins it is still in use, and some few stones of the old building are yet to be seen there. The local tradition tells that the saint when labouring as a missionary in Strathglass with two companions, discovered, by previous revelation, three bright new bells buried in the earth Taking one for himself, he gave the others to his fellow-missionaries, bidding each to erect a church on the spot where his bell should ring for the third time of its own accord; undertaking to do the same with regard to his own. One of these companions founded a church at Glenconvinth, in Strathglass, the other at Broadford, Isle of Skye.

Saint Merchard travelled towards Glenmoriston. His bell rang first at Suidh Mhercheird (Merchard’s Seat), again at Fuaran Mhercheird (Merchard’s Well), near Ballintombuie, where a spring of excellent water treasured by both Catholics and Protestants still bears his name, and a third time at the spot where the old churchyard, called Clachan Mhercheird, close by the river Moriston, recalls his memory.

The bell of the saint was preserved there for centuries. After the church fell into decay’s early in the seventeenth century, the bell remained in the churchyard. The narrow-pointed spar of granite on which it rested still stands there. The bell, unfortunately, was wantonly removed, by Protestant strangers about thirty years ago, to the great indignation of the inhabitants of the glen, Protestant as well as Catholic; it has never since been discovered.

Tradition has it that the bell was wont to ring of its own accord when a funeral came in sight, and that whenever it was removed from its usual position it was invariably found restored miraculously to its place, Many persons still living in the glen have seen the bell, and the grandparents of some of them used to relate that they heard it ring in their youth. Devotion to this saint was very strong in that neighbourhood in Catholic times, and he is still regarded by Catholics as the local patron.

== Butler's account ==
The hagiographer Alban Butler mentions the bishop briefly in his The Lives of the Primitive Fathers, Martyrs, and Other Principal Saints,

August 24 – St. Irchard, or Erthad, Bishop and Confessor in Scotland

ST. PALLADIUS sent Servanus to preach to the northern islands of Orkney, and St. Ternan bishop to the Picts, who is titular saint of the cathedral of Abernethe, and many other churches. St. Irchard was bishop of the Picts about the same time, according to some Scottish historians; but more probably, according to others, about the reign of Malcolm I. See the Breviary of Aberdeen, and Cuper the Bollandist, p. 773.

== Mackay's account ==
The local historian William Mackay (1848–1928) wrote in his Urquhart and Glenmoriston: Olden Times in a Highland Parish (1893),

Ternan's disciple, Erchard, it is almost certain, penetrated far into the northern territory. A tradition which has probably come down from his own time tells that he was the first who preached the gospel in Glenmoriston, and to him the ancient church of that Glen—Clachan Mhercheird was dedicated.

Erchard, or Merchard, as he latterly came to be called, was a native of the district of Kincardine O’Neil, on the southern slopes of the Grampians. He became a zealous Christian in his early youth, and Ternan not only ordained him priest, but also appointed him his own coadjutor. It was perhaps while he laboured with Ternan that he visited our Parish. In after life he went to Rome, and was consecrated bishop by Pope Gregory. On his return journey he visited the Picts of Pictavia, now Poitou, in France, and brought back to the truth such of them as had lapsed into paganism. Falling sick, he prayed God that he might not see death till he arrived in his own country, and hastened northward through France and England. He reached Kincardin O’Neil to be honourably received by his people, and then died. According to his own instructions, his body was placed on a cart drawn by two horses, which were allowed to go forth where they listed. He was buried where they first stopped, and a church was built over his grave.

Such, briefly, are the circumstances of his life and death, as given in the Breviary of Aberdeen and other ancient writings. Much more is told of him in the traditions of Glenmoriston. While labouring in Strathglass with two missionary companions, his attention was drawn to a white cow which day after day stood gazing at a certain tree, without bending its neck to eat, and yet went home each evening as well filled as the other cattle. Curiosity, or a higher influence, led him to dig up the earth at the foot of the tree, and there he found three bells, new and burnished as if fresh from the maker’s hands. Taking one himself, and giving the others to his companions, he bade each go his own way and erect a church where his bell should ring the third time of its own accord. One went eastward, and founded the church of Glenconvinth; another westward, and erected his church at Broadford in Skye; while Merchard himself travelled southward in the direction of Glenmoriston. When he reached the hill now called Suidh Mhercheird, or Merchard’s Seat, his bell rang for the first time; it again rang at Fuaran Mhercheird (Merchard’s Well) at Ballintombuie; and it rang the third time at that spot by the side of the Eiver Moriston which is now the old burying-ground of Glenmoriston. There he built his church—Clachan Mhercheird; and there and in the surrounding districts he for a time taught and preached. He became the patron saint of Glenmoriston; and his solicitude for the Glenmoriston people has not yet ceased. His acts of mercy and love have been without number. One example may be given. In former times, when a tenant died, his best horse went to the proprietor as each-ursainn—herezeld, or heriot. If the deceased left no horse, a horse's value was taken in cattle or sheep. On one occasion—twelve hundred years after Merchard’s death—it came to pass that a poor Glenmoriston tenant died, leaving a widow to succeed him. He had left no horse, and the ground-officer took the heriot in sheep. That same night, as the officer lay in bed, an unearthly voice spake to him:—

’S mise Merchard mor nam feart,
’S mi dol dachaidh chum an anmoich;
Is innis thusa do Mhac-Phadruig
Nach fheaird e gu brath a’ mheanbh-chrodh!

(“I am great Merchard of the miracles, passing homeward in the night. Declare thou unto Mac Phatrick [the laird] that the widow’s sheep will never bring him good.”)

With the morning’s sun the terror-stricken man appeared before his master and delivered the ghostly message. The sheep were instantly returned to the widow, and from that day until now no heriot has been exacted in Glenmoriston. Merchard’s bell was preserved at his clachan until about the year 1870, when it went amissing—removed, it is supposed, by strangers employed in the district. Its powers and attributes were of a wonderful order. It indicated, as we have seen, where Merchard’s church was to be built. Until the very last the sick and infirm who touched it in faith were strengthened and cured. After the church became ruinous, in the seventeenth century, the bell was kept on an ancient tombstone, specially set apart for it. If removed to any other place it mysteriously found its way back. When a funeral approached, it rang of its own accord, saying, “Dhachaidh! dhachaidh! gu do leabaidh bhuan!”—“Home! home! to thy lasting place of rest!” If thrown into water it floated on the surface, but this the people were slow to put to the test, in deference to Merchard’s warning:—

’S mise Merchard thar an fhonn:
Cuimhnichibh trom trom mo shàr’adh;
’S fiach’ nach cuir sibh air-son geall
An clag so air a’ pholl a shnamhadh.

(“I am Merchard from across the land: keep ye my sufferings deep in your remembrance; and see that ye do not for a wager [or trial] place this bell in the pool to swim.”)

== Sources ==
- Barrett, Dom Michael (18 July 2020), A Calendar of Scotish Saints, BoD – Books on Demand, ISBN 978-3-7523-2290-3 This article incorporates text from this source, which is in the public domain.
- Butler, Alban (1799), The Lives of the Primitive Fathers, Martyrs, and Other Principal Saints, J. Moir This article incorporates text from this source, which is in the public domain.
- Mackay, William (1893), Urquhart and Glenmoriston: Olden Times in a Highland Parish, Northern Counties Newspaper and Printing and Publishing Company, Limited This article incorporates text from this source, which is in the public domain.
