= Dimsdale baronets =

Extinct baronetcy in the Baronetage of the United Kingdom

- Escutcheon of the Dimsdale baronets of Goldsmiths and Lancaster Street
- Creation date: 1902
- Status: extinct
- Extinction date: 1978
- Motto: Quod Deus vult fiet

The Dimsdale Baronetcy, of Goldsmiths, Langdon Hills, in the County of Essex and of Lancaster Street in the Borough of Paddington in the County of London, was a title in the Baronetage of the United Kingdom. It was created on 24 July 1902 for Sir Joseph Dimsdale, Lord Mayor of London from 1901 to 1902.

== Dimsdale baronets, of Goldsmiths and Lancaster Street (1902) ==
- Sir Joseph Cockfield Dimsdale, 1st Baronet (1849–1912)
- Sir John Holdsworth Dimsdale, 2nd Baronet (1874–1923)
- Sir John Holdsworth Dimsdale, 3rd Baronet (1901–1978)

The title became extinct on the death of the third Baronet in 1978, who had no heir from either of his wives, Gisela Panova née Kanznerova and Arabella Gladys Broughton.

Baronetage of the United Kingdom
Preceded by Bradford baronets	Dimsdale baronets of Goldsmiths and Lancaster Street (1902); 24 July 1902	Succeeded by Evans baronets
