= David Dumbreck =

Sir David Dumbreck KCB (25 October 1805 – 24 January 1876) was a Scottish surgeon and British Army medical officer.

== Life ==
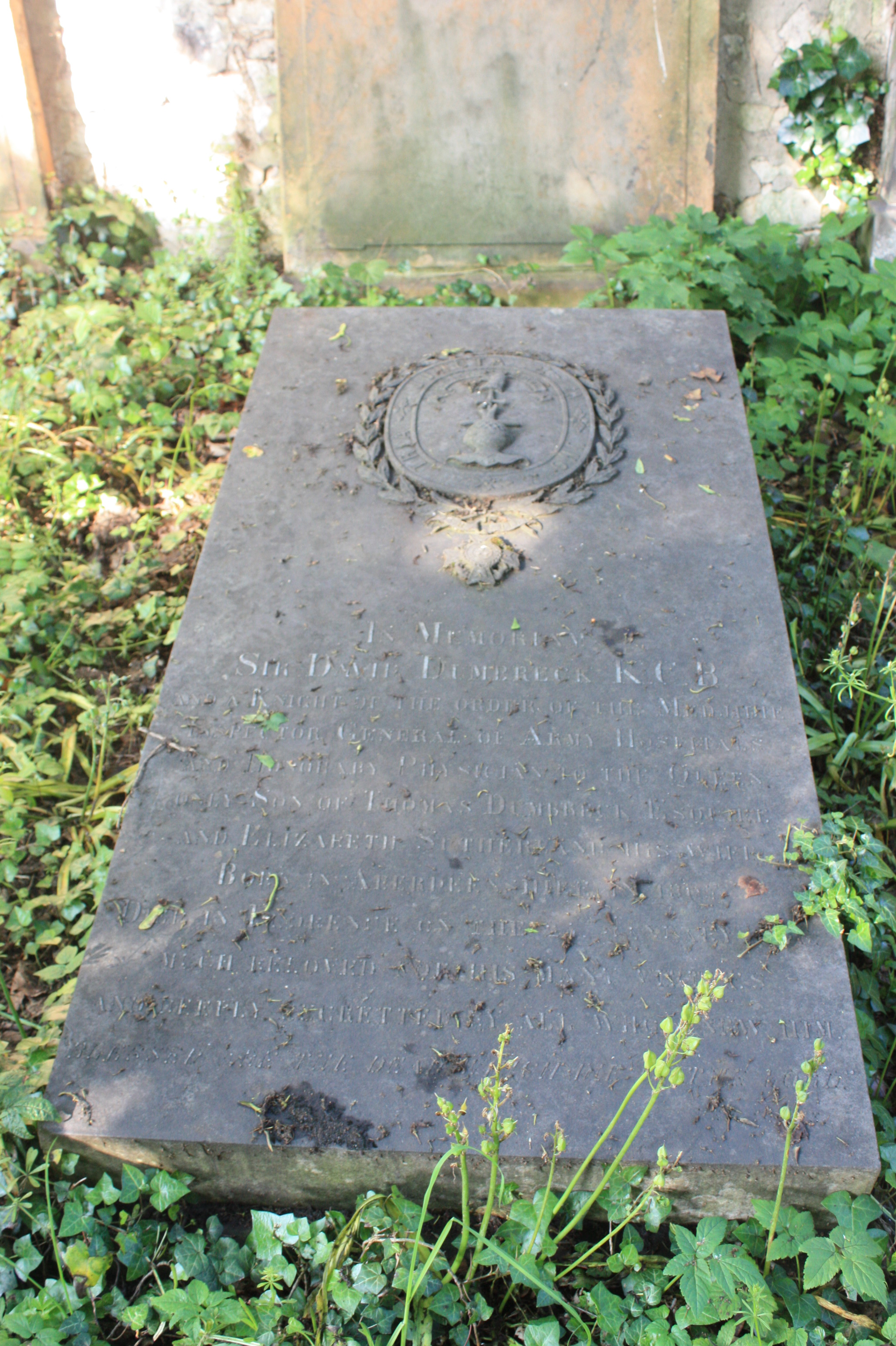
Memorial to Sir David Dumbreck, Warriston Cemetery

Dumbreck, the only son of Thomas Dumbreck, collector of inland revenue at Glasgow, by Elizabeth, youngest daughter of David Sutherland of the same service, was born in Kincardine O'Neil, Aberdeenshire in 1805 and educated at the University of Edinburgh, where he graduated M.D. in 1830, having previously, in 1825, passed as a licentiate of the Royal College of Surgeons in Edinburgh. He entered the British Army as a hospital assistant on 3 November 1825, became assistant surgeon in 1826, surgeon in 1841, surgeon-major in 1847, and deputy inspector-general on 28 March 1854.

Prior to the breaking out of hostilities with Russia he was despatched on a special mission early in 1854 to the expected seat of war, and traversed on his mission Serbia, Bulgaria, and part of Roumelia, crossing the Balkans on his route. He was subsequently for a short time principal medical officer with the army, and served with it in the field as senior deputy inspector-general, and was present in this capacity and attached to headquarters at the time of the affair of Bulganac, the Alma, capture of Balaklava, battles of Balaklava and Inkerman, and siege of Sebastopol. His rewards were a medal with four clasps, the fourth class of the Medjidie, and the Turkish medal.

He was gazetted C.B. on 4 February 1856, became K.C.B. on 20 May 1871, and was named honorary physician to the Queen on 21 November 1865. On 19 July 1859 he was promoted to be an inspector-general of the medical department, and on 1 May in the following year was placed on half-pay and received a special pension for distinguished services.

He married, on 27 February 1844, Elizabeth Campbell, only daughter of George Gibson of Leith. He died at 34 Via Montebello, Florence, on 24 January 1876, and his will was proved on 21 March under £12,000.

His tomb in Florence's English Cemetery carefully depicts his medals:

Sir David Dumbreck K.C.B.
Born in Aberdeenshire 1805
Inspector General of Army Hospitals and
Honorary Physician to the Queen Served with
Distinction in the Crimea Was Present at the Battles
Of Alma Balaclava Inkermann and the seige [sic] of Sebastopol, for Which He
Received the Crimea Medal With 4 Classes
The Turkish Medal and the Knighthood of
the Order of the Medjidie
He Departed This Life at Florence 24 Jan 1876 Universally Regretted
This Monument Has Been Erected to his Memory by His Sorrowing Widow
Blessed Are the Dead Which Die in the Lord
REV. XIV.15
F5C

He is also memorialised at his parents grave in Warriston Cemetery in Edinburgh, close to the old east entrance.
