= Evans baronets of Tubbendens (1902) =

Extinct baronetcy in the Baronetage of the United Kingdom

Escutcheon of the Evans baronets of Tubbenden

The Evans baronetcy, of Tubbendens in the parish of Farnborough in the County of Kent, was created in the Baronetage of the United Kingdom on 24 July 1902 for the politician Sir Francis Evans, KCMG, He was Liberal Member of Parliament for Southampton from 1895 to 1900 and for Maidstone from 1901 to 1906. The title became extinct on the death of the 3rd Baronet in 1970., who left no heir.

== Evans baronets, of Tubbendens (1902) ==
- Sir Francis Henry Evans, 1st Baronet (1840–1907)
- Rev. Sir Murland de Grasse Evans, 2nd Baronet (1874–1946), a schoolfriend of Winston Churchill.
- Sir Evelyn Ward Evans, 3rd Baronet (1883–1970)

== Notes ==
Baronetage of the United Kingdom
Preceded by Dimsdale baronets	Evans baronets of Tubbendens (1902); 24 July 1902	Succeeded by Henderson baronets
