= Sir John Bradford, 1st Baronet =

Professor Sir John Bradford Bt KCMG CB CBE FRS FRCP
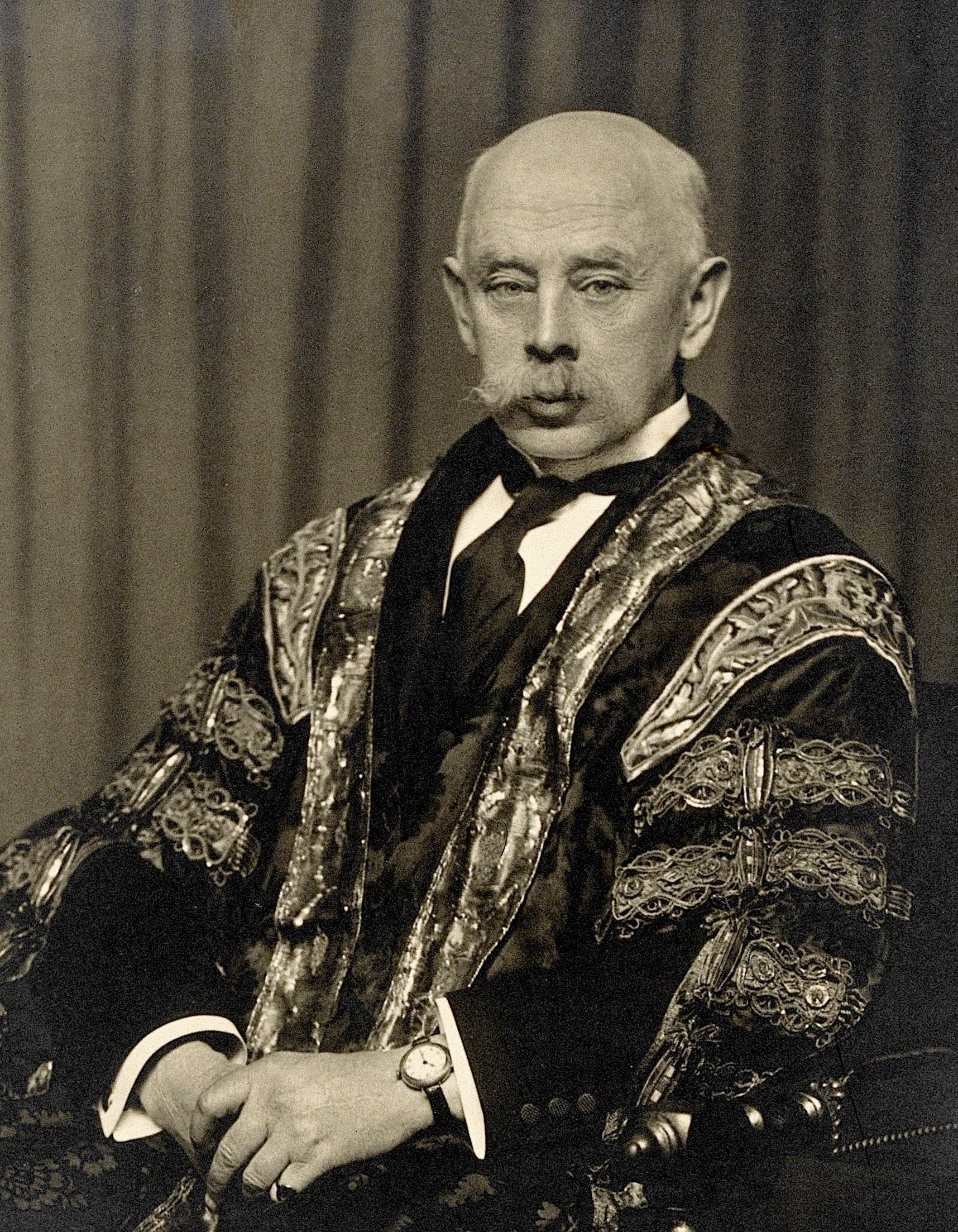
- Born: 7 May 1863; London, England
- Died: 7 April 1935 (aged 71); London, England
- Education: University College
- Occupation: Physician

Sir John Rose Bradford, 1st Baronet (7 May 1863 – 7 April 1935) was a British physician.

== Early life ==
John Rose Bradford was born in London, the son of Abraham Rose and Ellen (née Littleton) Bradford. His father was a Deputy Inspector-General of Hospitals in the Royal Navy. He was educated at University College School and in Bruges, before studying for a degree at University College and qualifying as a doctor in 1883.

== Career ==
After serving as a house physician in University College Hospital he was made an Assistant Physician in 1889 and then moved to hold the same position at the National Hospital for the Paralysed and Epileptic from 1893 to 1896.

His main interest was physiological research on such subjects as the electrical phenomena accompanying secretion, the action of drugs on the circulation and secretion of the kidney, and the innervation of various blood vessels. In 1894 he was elected a Fellow of the Royal Society and in 1898 published Clinical Lectures on Nephritis.

In 1895 he was made Professor-Superintendent of the Brown Institution, a post which he occupied for eight years until 1902. In the same year he was appointed to the Professorship of Material Medica at University College, later becoming Professor of Medicine and Holme Lecturer on clinical medicine. In 1897 he was promoted to full Physician at University College Hospital after which his duties became more administrative. He chaired a number of committees and became Secretary of the Royal Society. After gaining a knowledge of tropical diseases as Physician to the Seamen's Hospital he became Senior Medical Advisor to the Colonial Office from 1912 to 1924. In 1924 he stood unsuccessfully as candidate for the University of London parliamentary seat.

General election 1924: London University
Party	Candidate	Votes	%	±%
Independent	Ernest Graham-Little	3,202	37.06	+37.06
Unionist	John Bradford	2,813	32.55	−17.60
Liberal	Albert Pollard	1,539	17.81	−14.40
Labour	Frank Bushnell	1,087	12.58	−5.06
Majority		389	4.50	
Turnout		8,641	72.03	+0.75
Registered electors		11,997		
Independent gain from Unionist		Swing	N/A	

He was elected as a fellow of the Royal College of Physicians, where he delivered the Goulstonian Lecture (1898), the Croonian Lecture (1904) and the Lumleian Lectures (1920). In 1926 he gave the Harveian Oration and then served as President of the College from 1926 to 1930. Under his presidency the College celebrated in 1928 the tercentenary of the publication of Harvey’s De Motu Cordis.

During the First World War he served in France for five years as Consulting Physician to the British Expeditionary Force with the rank of Major-General. Appointed Knight Commander of the Order of St Michael and St George (KCMG) in 1911, he was admitted as a Companion of the Order of the Bath (CB) in 1915 and a Commander of the Order of the British Empire (CBE) in 1919. He was created a baronet, of Mawddwy in the County of Merioneth on 26 January 1931.

== Personal life ==
He had married in 1899 Mary Roberts, O.B.E., the daughter of Thomas Ffoulkes Roberts. They had no children.

He died in London in 1935.

== See also ==
- Bradford baronets

Academic offices
Preceded by Sir Humphry Davy Rolleston, Bt	President of the Royal College of Physicians; 1926–1930	Succeeded by The Lord Dawson of Penn
Baronetage of the United Kingdom
New creation	Baronet (of Mawddwy); 1931–1935	Extinct
