= Denfert-Rochereau =

Denfert-Rochereau may refer to:

- Pierre Philippe Denfert-Rochereau, a soldier of the Franco-Prussian War.
- Avenue Denfert-Rochereau, a road in Paris commemorating him.
- Place Denfert-Rochereau, a square in Paris, also commemorating him.
- Denfert-Rochereau station (Paris Metro), the Metro station.
- Denfert-Rochereau station (Paris RER), the RER station.
