= Bradford baronets =

Set index for Bradford baronets

There have been two baronetcies created for persons with the surname Bradford, both in the Baronetage of the United Kingdom. As of 2026 one is extant.

- Bradford baronets of South Audley Street (1902)
- Bradford baronets of Mawddwy (1931): see John Bradford, 1st Baronet (1863–1935)
