= Champigny en Rochereau =

- Commune
- Location of Champigny en Rochereau
- Location within France Location within Nouvelle-Aquitaine
- Coordinates: 46°42′58″N 0°09′22″E
- Country: France
- Region: Nouvelle-Aquitaine
- Department: Vienne
- Arrondissement: Poitiers
- Canton: Migné-Auxances
- Intercommunality: Haut-Poitou

Government
  - Mayor (2020–2026): Dominique Dabadie
- Area^{1}: 33.24 km^{2} (12.83 sq mi)
- Population (2023): 1,878
  - Density: 56.50/km^{2} (146.3/sq mi)
- Time zone: UTC+01:00 (CET)
  - Summer (DST): UTC+02:00 (CEST)
- INSEE/Postal code: 86053 /86170
- ^{1} French Land Register data, which excludes lakes, ponds, glaciers > 1 km^{2} (0.386 sq mi or 247 acres) and river estuaries.

Champigny en Rochereau (French pronunciation: [ʃɑ̃piɲi ɑ̃ ʁɔʃʁo]) is a commune in the department of Vienne, western France. The municipality was established on 1 January 2017 by merger of the former communes of Champigny-le-Sec (the seat) and Le Rochereau.

== See also ==
- Communes of the Vienne department
