= Bélâbre =

- Commune
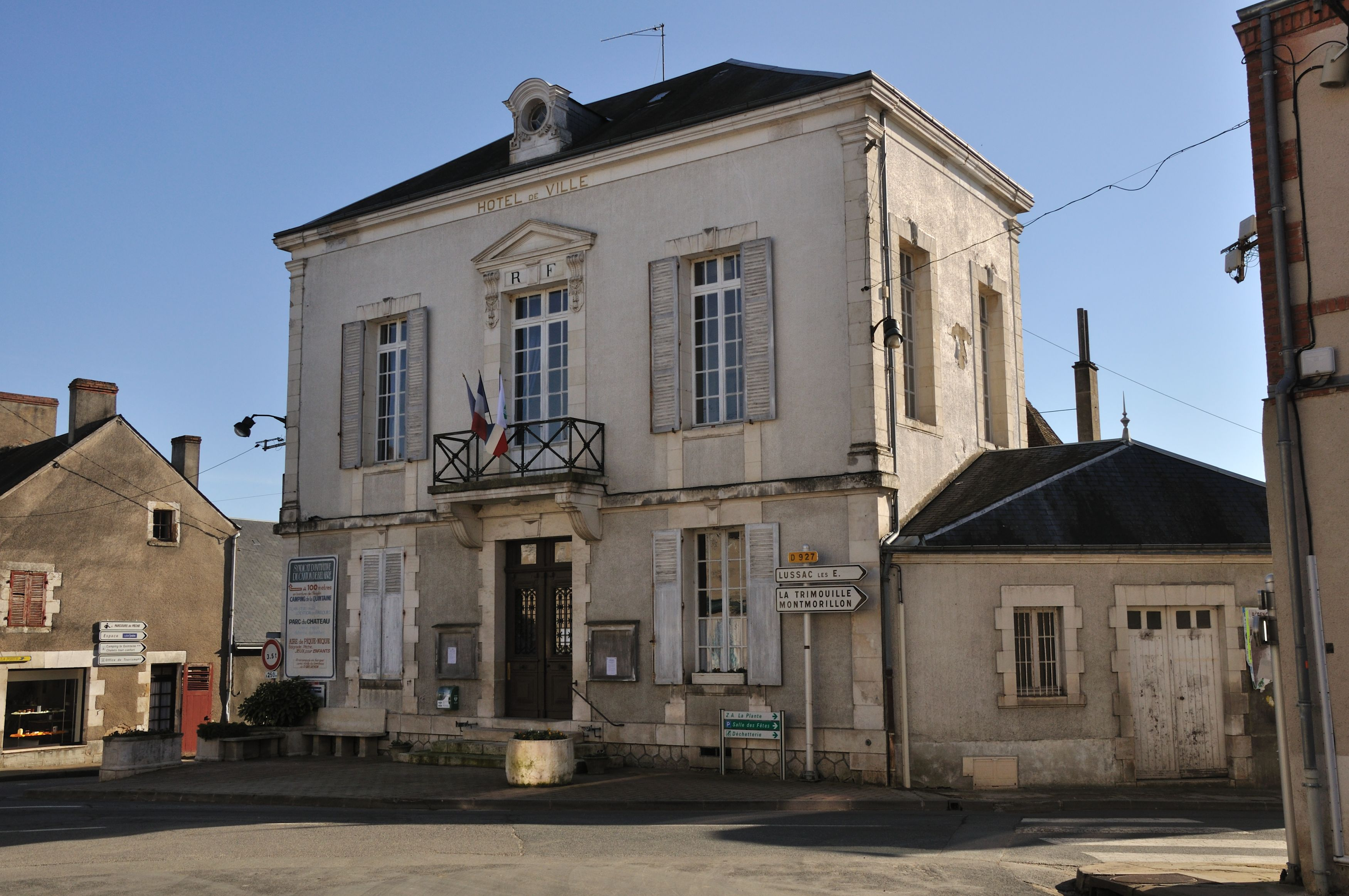
- Town hall

- Coat of arms
- Location of Bélâbre
- Location within France Location within Centre-Val de Loire
- Coordinates: 46°33′08″N 1°09′32″E
- Country: France
- Region: Centre-Val de Loire
- Department: Indre
- Arrondissement: Le Blanc
- Canton: Saint-Gaultier

Government
  - Mayor (2020–2026): Laurent Laroche
- Area^{1}: 40.14 km^{2} (15.50 sq mi)
- Elevation: 107 m (351 ft)
- Highest elevation: 156 m (512 ft)
- Lowest elevation: 95 m (312 ft)
- Population (2023): 923
  - Density: 23.0/km^{2} (59.6/sq mi)
- Time zone: UTC+01:00 (CET)
  - Summer (DST): UTC+02:00 (CEST)
- INSEE/Postal code: 36016 /36370
- ^{1} French Land Register data, which excludes lakes, ponds, glaciers > 1 km^{2} (0.386 sq mi or 247 acres) and river estuaries.

Bélâbre (French pronunciation: [belabʁ]) is a commune in the Indre department in central France. It is the site of the Gallic city of Vosagum during the era of the Roman Empire's domination of this part of western Gaul (France).

== Geography ==
The commune is located in the parc naturel régional de la Brenne.

The river Anglin flows northwest through the commune and crosses the village.

== Population ==
Historical population
Year	Pop.	±% p.a.
1968	1,336	—
1975	1,260	−0.83%
1982	1,067	−2.35%
1990	1,062	−0.06%
1999	1,029	−0.35%
2007	958	−0.89%
2012	1,038	+1.62%
2017	968	−1.39%
2023	923	−0.79%
Source: INSEE

== See also ==
- Communes of the Indre department
- Hubert Rochereau's preserved room
