= Le Rochereau =

- Part of Champigny en Rochereau
- Location of Le Rochereau
- Location within France Location within Nouvelle-Aquitaine
- Coordinates: 46°42′25″N 0°09′14″E
- Country: France
- Region: Nouvelle-Aquitaine
- Department: Vienne
- Arrondissement: Poitiers
- Canton: Vouneuil-sous-Biard
- Commune: Champigny en Rochereau
- Area^{1}: 8.93 km^{2} (3.45 sq mi)
- Elevation: 123 m (404 ft)
- Highest elevation: 148 m (486 ft)
- Lowest elevation: 110 m (360 ft)
- Population (2019): 851
  - Density: 95.3/km^{2} (247/sq mi)
- Time zone: UTC+01:00 (CET)
  - Summer (DST): UTC+02:00 (CEST)
- Postal code: 86170
- ^{1} French Land Register data, which excludes lakes, ponds, glaciers > 1 km^{2} (0.386 sq mi or 247 acres) and river estuaries.

Le Rochereau (French pronunciation: [lə ʁɔʃʁo]) is a former commune in the Vienne department in the Nouvelle-Aquitaine region in western France. On 1 January 2017, it was merged into the new commune Champigny en Rochereau.

== See also ==
- Communes of the Vienne department
