= Hubert Rochereau's preserved room =

WWI soldier's preserved room

- The bed within Hubert Rochereau's room along with several of his possessions

Hubert Rochereau's preserved room, also known by locals as the Soldier's Room (French: La chambre du poilu), is the bedroom of the French Army officer Hubert Rochereau, who was killed in 1918 during the First World War. After he left for the war, Rochereau's parents in Bélâbre left the room largely untouched. When he died on 26 April 1918, his parents sealed the entrance to the room with bricks in order to sustain his memory, though not before adding a vial of soil and various belongings of his, including a posthumously awarded Legion of Honour and Croix de Guerre as well as a portrait. Before selling the house in 1935, his parents requested in the sale that the room should be preserved for 500 years, though this condition carried no legal weight.

From 1935, the room, and the house, were in the possession of French General Eugène Bridoux. Bridoux became a governmental figure within the Vichy Regime of France, and was later captured by the Allies during the liberation of France. The house was confiscated by the government, though it was reclaimed later by Bridoux's granddaughter. After her death, the house was transferred to her husband who continued to preserve Rochereau's room. In 2023, the house was once again transferred to new owners, who deemed the preservation unsustainable due to degradation from age and insect damage. They collaborated with the town council, which led to a relocation project beginning in 2023 to recreate and restore it in a dedicated museum. The museum is expected to open in April 2028.

== Hubert Rochereau ==
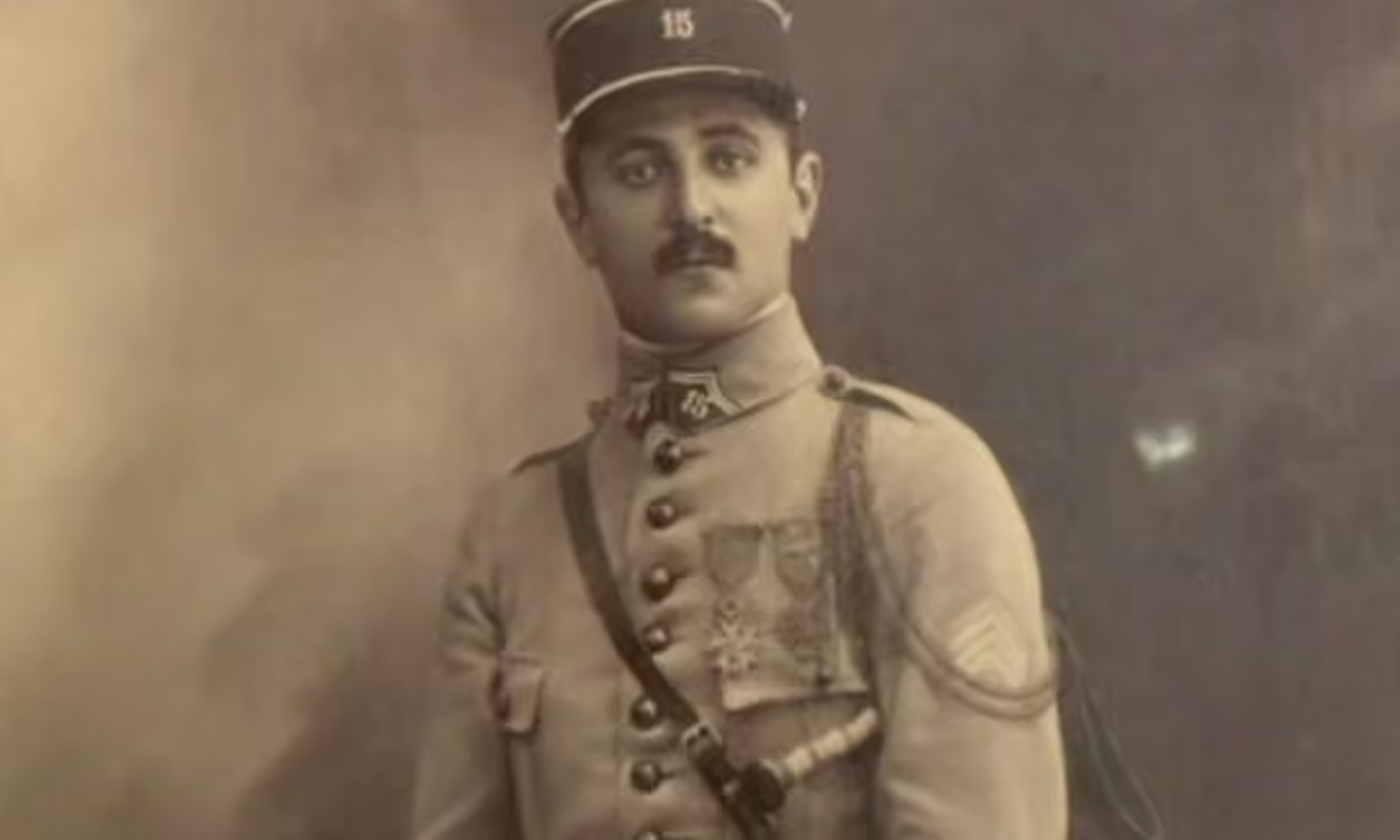
The portrait of Rochereau that was placed within the preserved room

Hubert Rochereau was born in October 1896 in the central French commune of Bélâbre. During the First World War, he was commissioned into the French Army's 15th Dragoon Regiment at the rank of second lieutenant. Rochereau was sent to the Yser Front of the war in Flanders. While fighting for control of the Belgian village of Loker, he was injured and later died from his wounds in a British field ambulance on 26 April 1918, at 21 years old. He was posthumously awarded a Legion of Honour and a Croix de Guerre for bravery. After his death, his parents were unable to locate his body until 1922, when it was found in a British cemetery and relocated to the Bélâbre graveyard. After his departure for the battlefront, Rochereau's parents left his room largely untouched except for the addition of a vial of soil from Flanders after his death.

== History ==
From 1918 to 1935, Rochereau's house was owned by his parents who left the room untouched following his departure. After his death, they added a number of items to the room including his awards, a portrait, and a vial of dirt labelled "the earth of Flanders in which our dear child fell and which kept his remains for four years". Later, they sealed the entrance to the room with bricks, closing it so as to memorialize his memory.

In 1935, ownership of the house was given to General Eugène Bridoux, a military friend of Rochereau's parents. Before giving it away, they stipulated the condition for their son's room to remain as it was for the next 500 years. This condition, however, was not legally binding, as remarked on by a later owner of the house. Bridoux went on to become secretary of state during the Vichy regime and was responsible for the deportation of Jewish families to Nazi concentration camps in the Second World War. During the liberation of France, he escaped to Germany; he was captured and once again escaped, fleeing to Francoist Spain, where he resided until his death in 1955. In the meantime, the house was confiscated by the French government before being rented to a family of solicitors.

Hubert Rochereau's desk and military jacket along with several other items. The coat is moth-eaten, like many other belongings. The box on the right reads "15 Dragons".

The house was later reclaimed in the 1950s by Bridoux's granddaughter. Upon her death, ownership of the house was transferred to her husband, Daniel Fabre, who continued to live in the house for over a decade. Like his predecessors, he continued to preserve Rochereau's room. In 2014, the room gained international media attention as the centenary of the start of the First World War drew close, though Fabre kept the room a private memorial closed to the public.

After the house was sold to new owners in 2023, Rochereau's room was deemed unable to be kept as the house needed to undergo significant renovation work and due to significant insect damage to the various clothes within the room. The new owners collaborated with the Bélâbre municipality in order to restore and preserve the site. The council later decided to inventory and digitize the room for the purpose of recreating it within a dedicated war museum. An association, L'association des Amis de la chambre du poilu (The Friends of the Soldier's Room association) was later established to support this project. Working with the newly elected municipal council, the association announced plans to finalize the museum space in the autumn of 2026. The museum is expected to open in April 2028, in time for the 110th anniversary of Rochereau's death.
