= Sir Edward Bradford, 1st Baronet =

British Indian Army officer

Colonel Sir Edward Bradford Bt GCB GCVO KCSI ADC
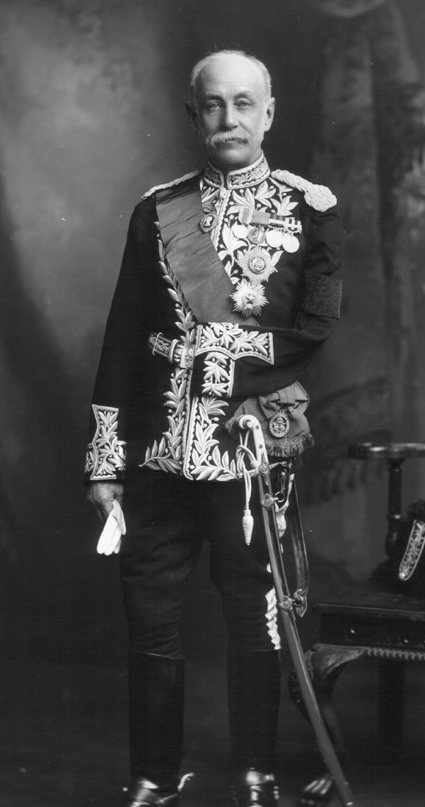
- Sir Edward Bradford, 1901

Commissioner of Police of the Metropolis
- In office June 1890 – 4 March 1903
- Monarch: Victoria; Edward VII
- Prime Minister: Marquess of Salisbury; William Ewart Gladstone; Earl of Rosebery; Marquess of Salisbury; Arthur Balfour
- Preceded by: James Monro
- Succeeded by: Edward Henry

Personal details
- Born: Edward Ridley Colborne Bradford; 27 July 1836 Buckinghamshire, England
- Died: 13 May 1911 (aged 74)
- Occupation: Indian Army officer

Colonel Sir Edward Ridley Colborne Bradford, 1st Baronet, GCB, GCVO, KCSI, ADC (27 July 1836 – 13 May 1911) was a British Indian Army officer who later served as Commissioner of Police of the Metropolis, head of the London Metropolitan Police, from 1890 to 1903.

== Military career ==
Bradford was born in Buckinghamshire, the son of William Mussage Kirkwall Bradford (1806–1878), the rector of West Meon, Hampshire, and was educated from 1846 at Marlborough College. He was commissioned into the East India Company's 2nd Madras Light Infantry (based at Jalna) in 1853, transferring to the 6th Madras Cavalry (based at Mhow) on his promotion to lieutenant in 1855. He saw active service in Persia (1856–1857), attached to the 14th The King's Light Dragoons, and in the latter stages of the Indian Mutiny, where he served as adjutant of the left wing of his regiment. In 1858, he transferred to Mayne's Irregular Cavalry (later the 1st Regiment of Central India Horse), of which he became Second-in-Command on 25 October 1858. He distinguished himself in a number of actions, especially against Tantya Tope at Cawnpore. In September 1860, with his health suffering from extended campaigning, he was ordered home to England to recuperate.

In 1862, he returned to India and was made Political Assistant in West Malwa. On 10 May 1863, he was mauled by a tigress during a hunt near Guna and lost his left arm. He continued to ride in pigsticking, holding the reins between his teeth, but his active military career was over.

== Indian Civil Service ==
He remained in the Indian Army, but served as Political Agent at successively Jaipur, Baghelkhand, Bharatpur and Mewar. He was promoted captain in 1865 and major in 1873. The following year he was made general superintendent of the Thuggee and Dacoity Department, which effectively acted as the Viceroy's secret police. In March 1878, he was appointed governor-general's agent for Rajputana and chief commissioner of Ajmer, in charge of relations with the Rajput princes, by whom he was respected and admired, not least because he had survived an encounter with a tiger. In private, however, he had no time for them, regarding them as lazy, vain, stupid and underhand. He was promoted lieutenant-colonel in 1879 and colonel in 1884. Having been appointed a Companion of the Order of the Star of India (CSI) in 1876, in June 1885, he was knighted as a Knight Commander of the Star of India (KCSI) for his services.

In 1887, he returned to London as secretary of the Political and Secret Department of the India Office, but the following year returned to India to conduct Prince Albert Victor, Duke of Clarence on a tour of the country, returning to England in 1889. He was made an Aide-de-Camp to Queen Victoria (holding the post until 1893), and was offered the governorship of Cape Colony, but refused it.

== Commissioner of Police ==
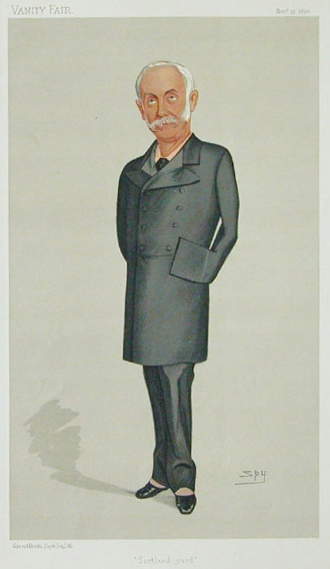
"Scotland Yard" Bradford as caricatured by Spy (Leslie Ward) in Vanity Fair, November 1890

In June 1890, Bradford was appointed to succeed James Monro as Commissioner of Police. His immediate concern was to restore stability after the Black Monday and Bloody Sunday riots and the resignation of three Commissioners in the past two years. He was an ideal choice. His military background gave him authority and experience of command (although his personality was generally easy-going), while his experiences in India gave him knowledge of administration, criminal investigation and the workings of the civil service. His years in control of the Met were generally peaceful and stable, with the police's standing in public opinion rising steadily. In 1899, crime in London fell to its lowest point in recorded history.

Bradford successfully settled the police strike of 1890, days after he took up office, and resisted the efforts of the new London County Council to take over his force from the Home Office. He visited every one of his police stations and talked and listened to his men, becoming the first Commissioner to do so. He varied the beats to ease the tedium of patrol duty and attempted to improve the educational standard of new recruits. He built more police stations and improved the quality of the section houses, ensured that all stations were linked by telegraph (although he disapproved of some other new technologies, such as telephones and typewriters, and would not introduce them), extended the use of bicycles, encouraged sporting activities among his men, and introduced a lighter summer uniform.

Bradford received many honours during his time as Commissioner. He was appointed Knight Commander of the Bath (KCB) in 1890, Knight Grand Cross of the Order of the Bath (GCB) in 1897, and Knight Grand Cross of the Royal Victorian Order (GCVO) in the 1902 Birthday Honours list (he was invested with the insignia by King Edward VII at Buckingham Palace on 18 December 1902). He became the first Commissioner to be created a baronet, announced in the 1902 Coronation Honours list published on 26 June 1902 for the (subsequently postponed) coronation of King Edward VII, and on 24 July 1902 he was created a Baronet, of South Audley Street, in the city of Westminster, in the county of London.

He retired on 4 March 1903.

== Later years ==
After his retirement, Bradford devoted much of his time to fox hunting, an activity in which he indulged several days every week. He also chaired a committee to enquire into the wages of General Post Office employees. He served as an extra equerry to both Edward VII and George V. Bradford died suddenly at his home in Westminster and was buried in the churchyard at Chawton, Hampshire, next to his first wife Elizabeth, who had died in 1896.

== Issue ==
By his first marriage to Elizabeth Adela Knight (1841–96) in 1866, he had a daughter and five sons. Their eldest son, Montagu Edward Bradford (1867–1890), died of cholera in India. His second son, Lieutenant-Colonel Sir Evelyn Ridley Bradford (1869–1914) of the Seaforth Highlanders, succeeded to the baronetcy and was killed in action in France on 14 September 1914. Their third and fourth sons, Daryl Colborne Bradford (1871–74) and Herbert Lewkenor (1873–4) both died in India. Their daughter Beryl Adela (1875–?) never married. Their fifth son, Lieutenant-Colonel Edward Austen Bradford, DSO (1879–1958) served with 60th Rifles.

He remarried in 1898 to Edith Mary Nicholson, who survived him with no issue.

== Styles ==
- 1836–1853: Edward Ridley Colborne Bradford
- 1853–1855: Second Lieutenant Edward Ridley Colborne Bradford
- 1855–1865: Lieutenant Edward Ridley Colborne Bradford
- 1865–1873: Captain Edward Ridley Colborne Bradford
- 1873–1879: Major Edward Ridley Colborne Bradford
- 1879–1884: Lieutenant-Colonel Edward Ridley Colborne Bradford
- 1884–1885: Colonel Edward Ridley Colborne Bradford
- 1885–1889: Colonel Sir Edward Ridley Colborne Bradford, KCSI
- 1889–1890: Colonel Sir Edward Ridley Colborne Bradford, KCSI, ADC
- 1890–1893: Colonel Sir Edward Ridley Colborne Bradford, KCB, KCSI, ADC
- 1893–1897: Colonel Sir Edward Ridley Colborne Bradford, KCB, KCSI
- 1897–1902: Colonel Sir Edward Ridley Colborne Bradford, GCB, KCSI
- 1902–1911: Colonel Sir Edward Ridley Colborne Bradford, Bt., GCB, GCVO, KCSI

== Footnotes ==
Government offices
Preceded by Sir Lewis Pelly	Chief Commissioner of Ajmer-Merwara; 1878–1887	Succeeded by Charles Walter
Police appointments
Preceded by James Monro	Commissioner of Police of the Metropolis; 1890–1903	Succeeded by Edward Henry
Baronetage of the United Kingdom
New creation	Baronet (of South Audley Street); 1902–1911	Succeeded by Evelyn Bradford
