= Touraine-Amboise =

French Appellation d'Origine Contrôlée of wine

Touraine-Ambois
- Wine region
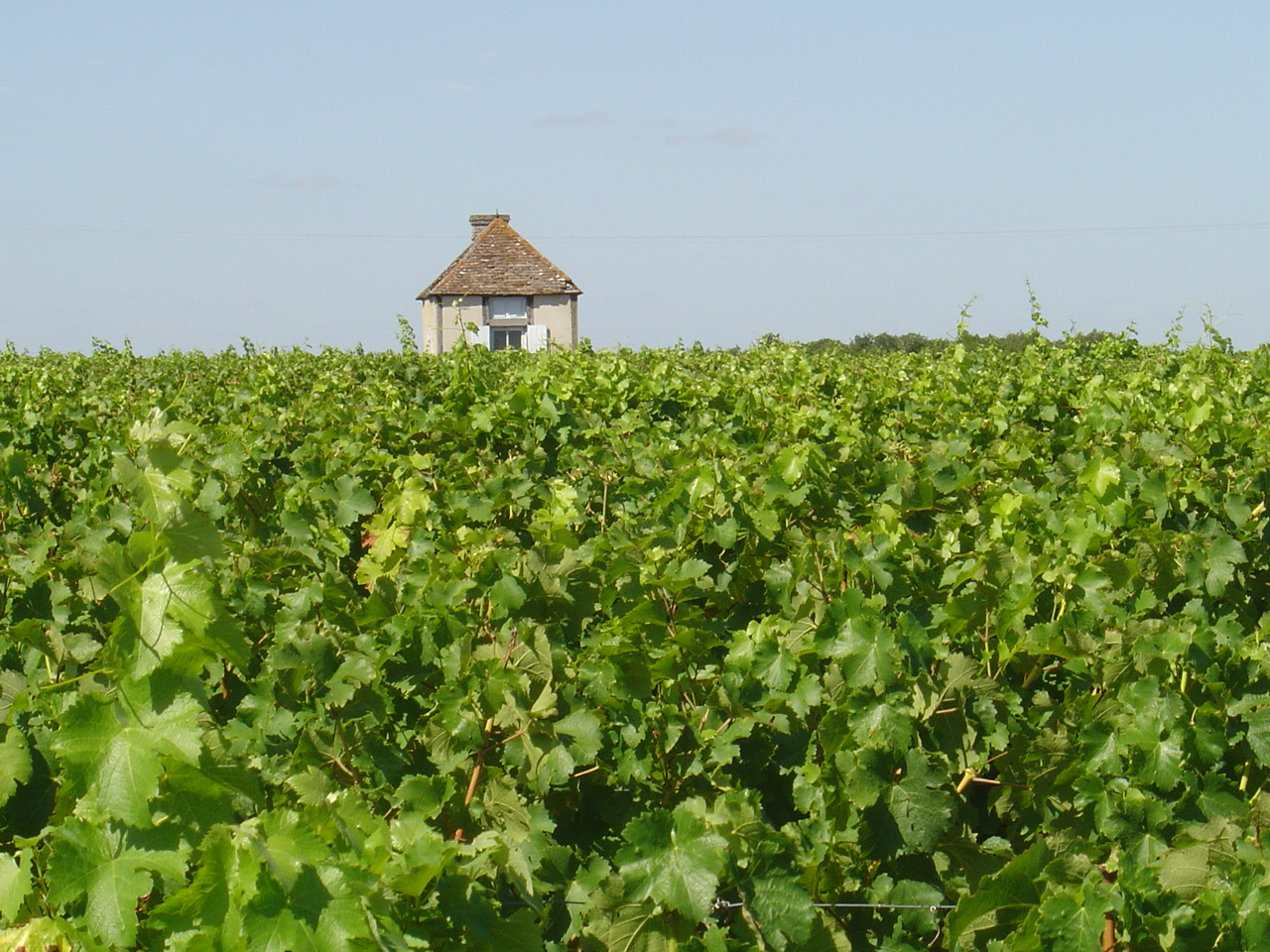
- Type: AOC
- Year established: 1954
- Country: France
- Climate region: oceanic and continental
- Soil conditions: containing carbonates on tuffeau on the higher slopes, or siliceous and fairly heavy on sands and gravels mixed with clay
- Size of planted vineyards: 220 ha
- Grapes produced: red:Côt; white: Chenin blanc

Touraine-Amboise (French pronunciation: [tuʁɛn ɑ̃bwaz]) is an Appellation d'Origine Contrôlée (AOC) in the Loire Valley wine region in France. It is situated within the wider Touraine AOC wine appellation. It is produced by ten communes bordering both sides of the River Loire. To their west lies the town of Amboise, with its royal château. Since its separation from the Touraine AOC in 1954, Touraine-Amboise has constituted an AOC in its own right. Annual production stands at 9,000 hectolitres of wine, spread between red, rosé, and still white wines. Effervescent wines are also produced within this AOC's boundaries, but they are not entitled to use the Touraine-Amboise appellation, belonging instead to the Touraine appellation.

== History ==
=== Prehistory and antiquity ===
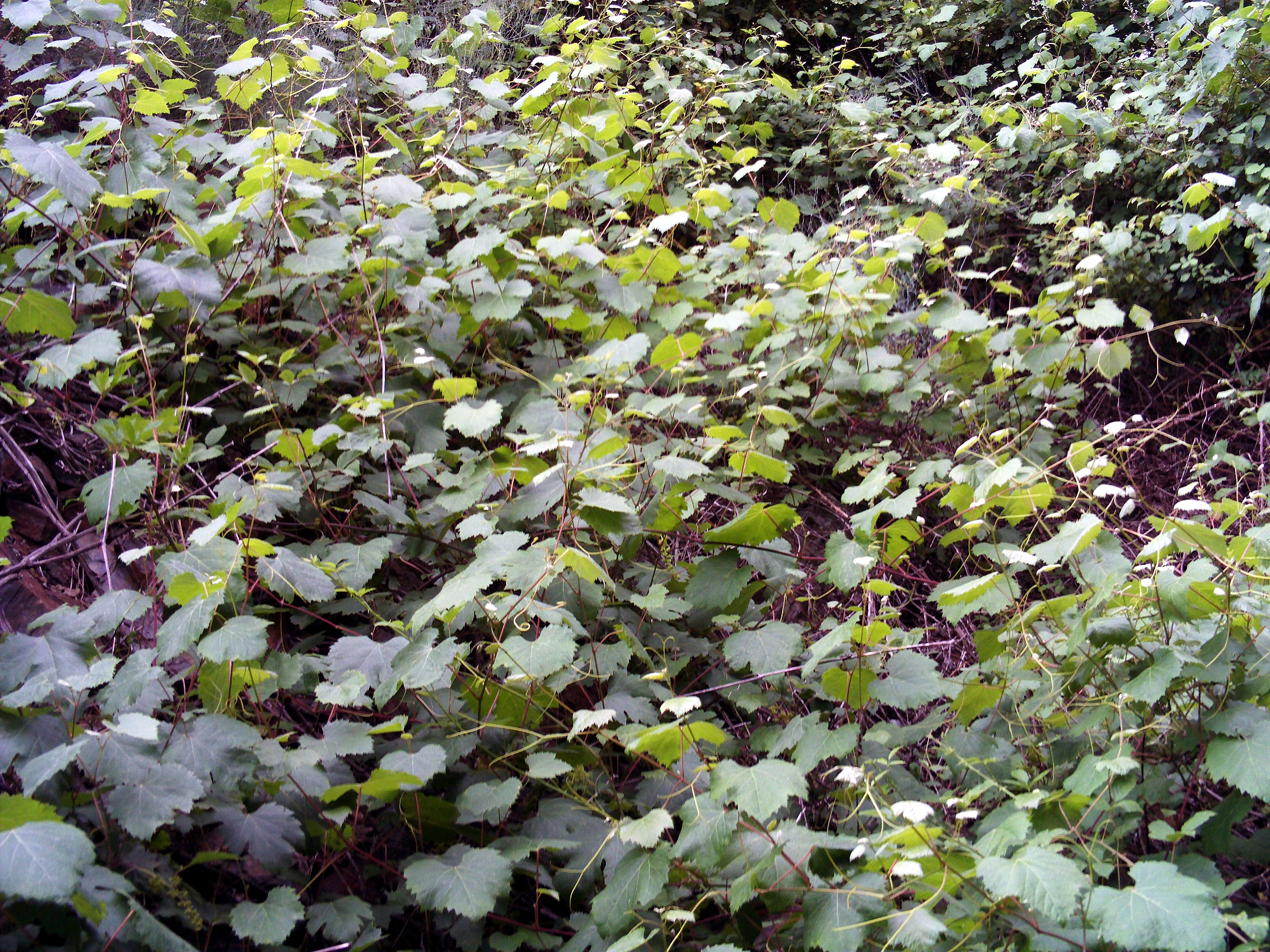
Wild Vine

There is evidence that people were living on the sloping hillsides of this middle stretch of the Loire as early as palaeolithic and neolithic times. The Châtelliers plateau, on the edge of which the Château of Amboise is built, contains one of the Loire region's most important Chasséen neolithic sites. An axe made with local stone and a dagger made with stone from the Grand-Pressigny region, have been discovered to the west of the market town of Limeray. Significant permanent settlements seem to have grown up at the start of the Bronze Age (approximately 5,000 years BC), while large-scale planting of the valleys dates from the final period of the Bronze Age, between 1,200 and 750 BC. At that time, following the last glacial period, vines already existed in their wild state as a kind of creeper growing on the edges of forests and on stony soils, but wine-making was as yet undiscovered.

In the first century AD the geographer, Pliny the Elder (23–79 AD), described wine-growing in Gaul as well-developed, but made no specific mention of wines produced along the banks of the Loire. Whereas the Nantes wine-growing area dates back to the Roman occupation, popular tradition links the start of vine cultivation in the province of Touraine (in the middle section of the Loire's course) to the founding of Marmoutier Abbey by St Martin in 372 AD. The fall of the Roman empire, and the turbulent centuries of the early Middle Ages that followed, interrupted the development of wine production, and the use of wine was restricted to religious practices and medical applications, in both cases dispensed by monasteries. This was documented by Sulpicius Severus, writing about meals at Marmoutier Abbey at the end of the 4th century: "Everyone gathered to break the fast and eat together; there was no wine provided except when illness demanded it". Several legends about the effects of drinking wine or pruning vines are linked to St Martin of Tours.

=== Middle Ages ===
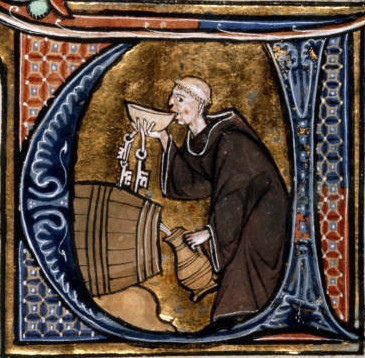
Monk tasting his wine

No information is available regarding wine-growing or wine production in the area directly around Amboise during the Middle Ages. One can only make deductions from what is known of the wine-growing history of the region, and assume that local circumstances would not have differed greatly.

In the High Middle Ages, the oldest record seems to be that of Gregory of Tours who described the damage caused to the vines by bad weather in the spring of 587. He refers on several occasions to vines growing near to the Basilica of St Martin of Tours. At the time the Basilica owned the villa at Nazelles close to Amboise, but there is no way of ascertaining whether the latter was planted with vines at that period.

From the 11th century onwards the majority of monasteries and abbeys strung out along the banks of the Loire were involved in wine-growing, taking full advantage of the opportunity for transporting wine by river. A text dating from this time describes how a cleric from Chinon used this mode of transport to take his wine to Nantes. (Note: Issue de La vie et les miracles de saint Mexme XI^{e}, cité dans Les vins de Loire, Éditions Montalba, 1979, p. 31)

=== Renaissance ===
The popularity of Touraine wines was due in no small part to the earthy writings of the French author, Rabelais, and his panegyric, "The Divine Bottle":

...In the liquor so divine,
Contained within your loins,
Bacchus, conqueror of India,
Lies all truth enclosed.

Amboise wines were especially enjoyed by the French king, Louis XI, who published a charter stipulating that Amboise wines should be sold before all other wines at the market in Tours. In 1477 he also introduced an annual gift of one hundred muids (one muid equalled eight French cubic feet) of wine to the monks of Canterbury Church. Touraine wine was also routinely served at the table of the French king, François I, who was apparently moved to comment: "Even though I was not born in Amboise, I grew up there, and all my life the taste of that divine draft from the beautiful city of Tours, so dear to my heart, has remained with me".

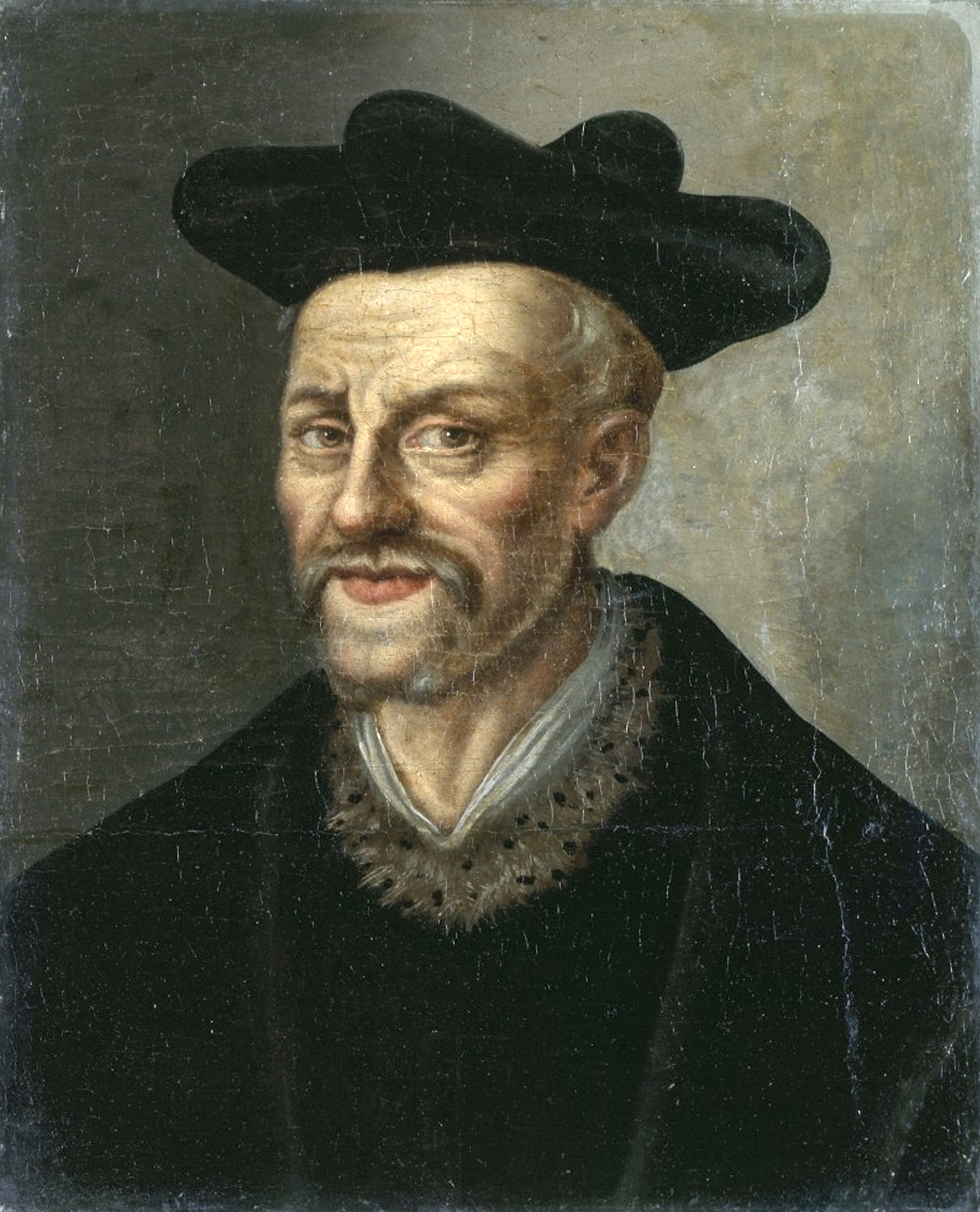
François Rabelais

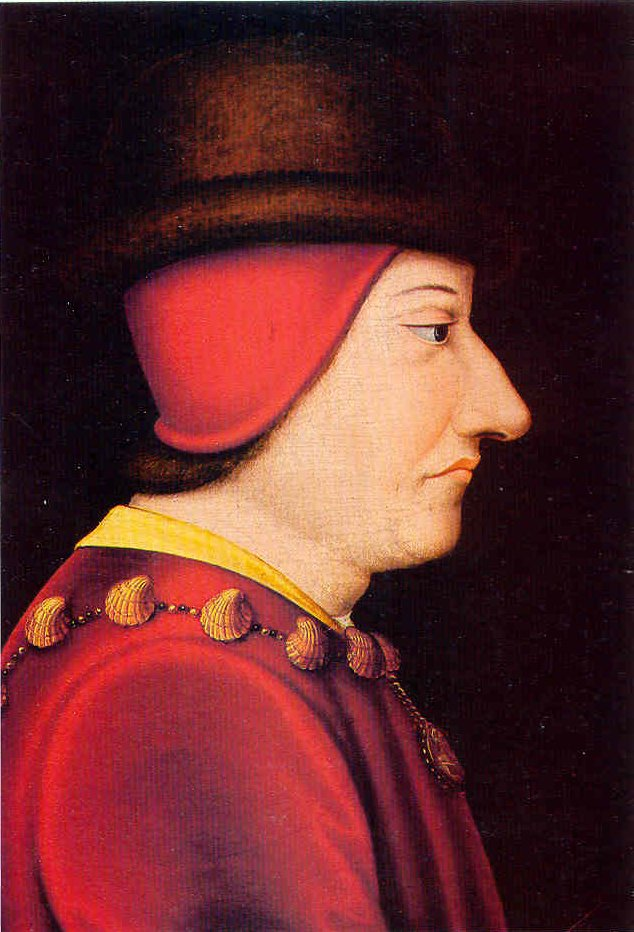
Louis XI of France

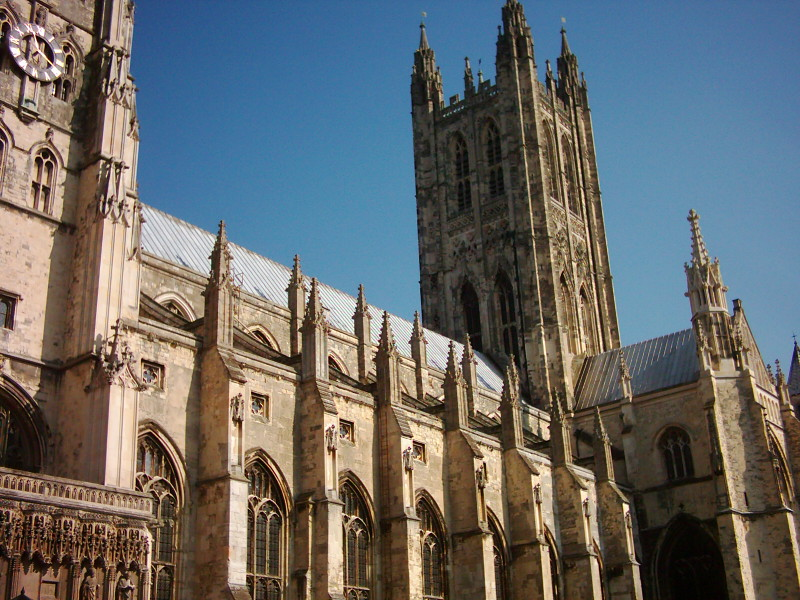
Canterbury Cathedral

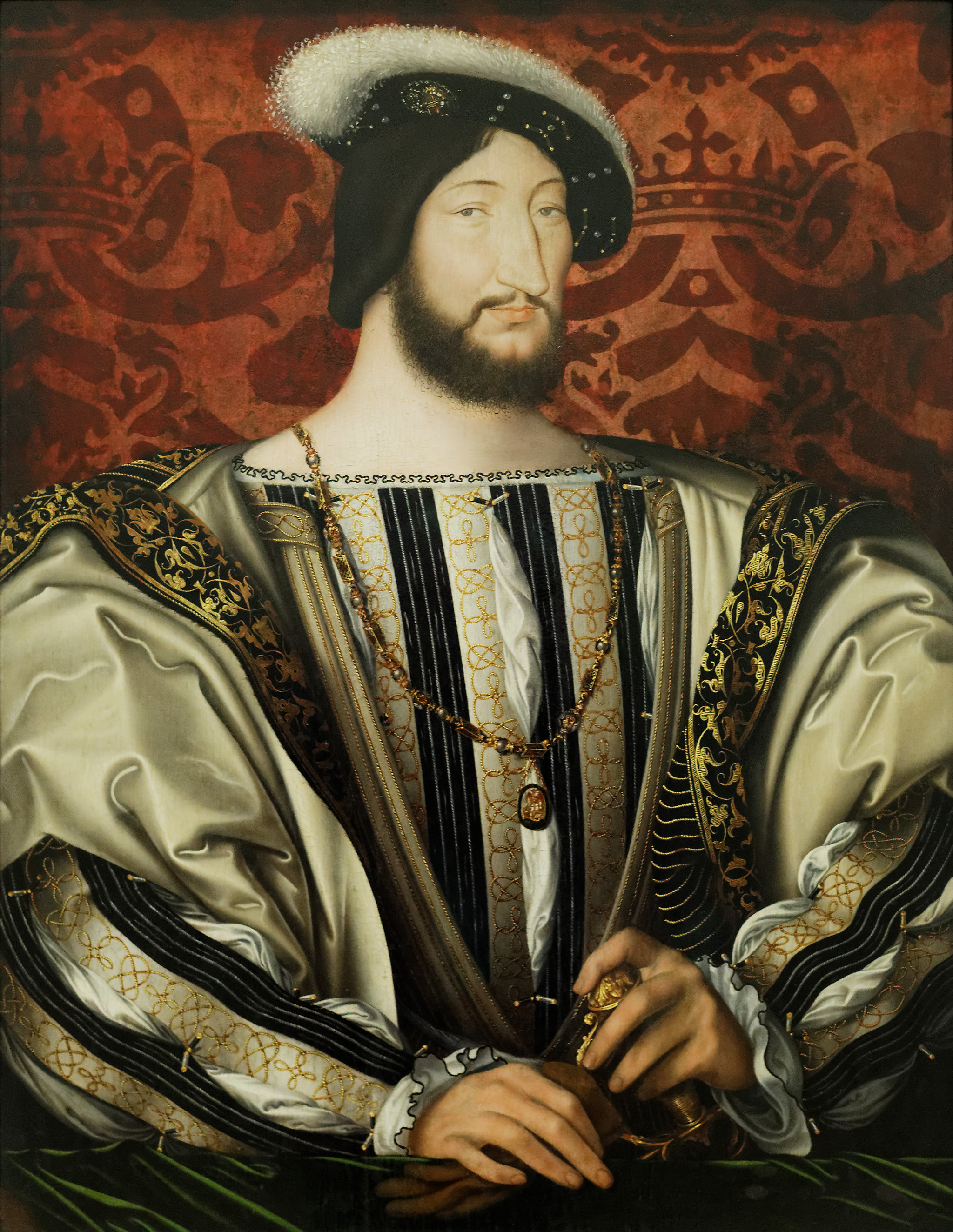
François I of France

=== Modern period ===
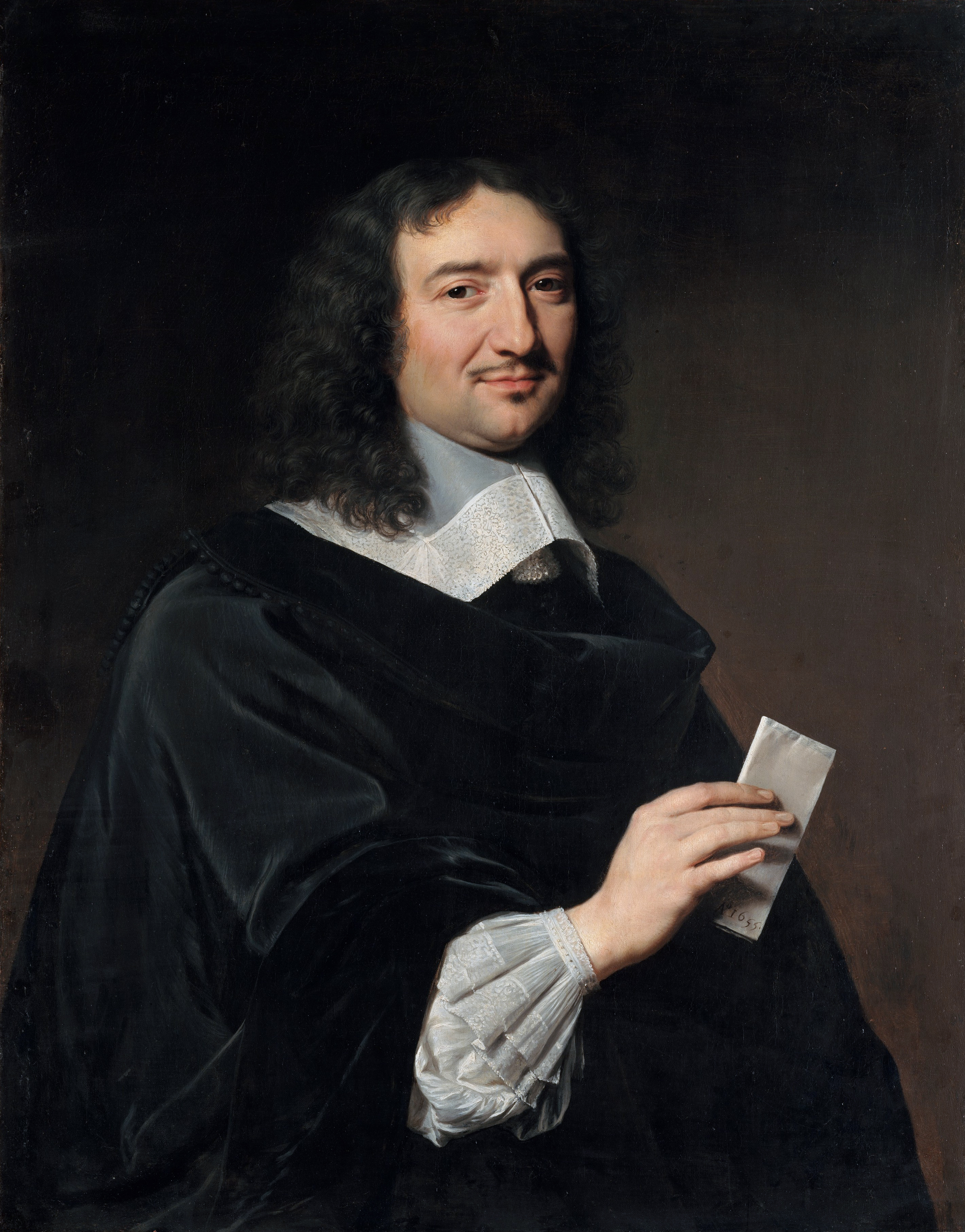
Jean-Baptiste Colbert

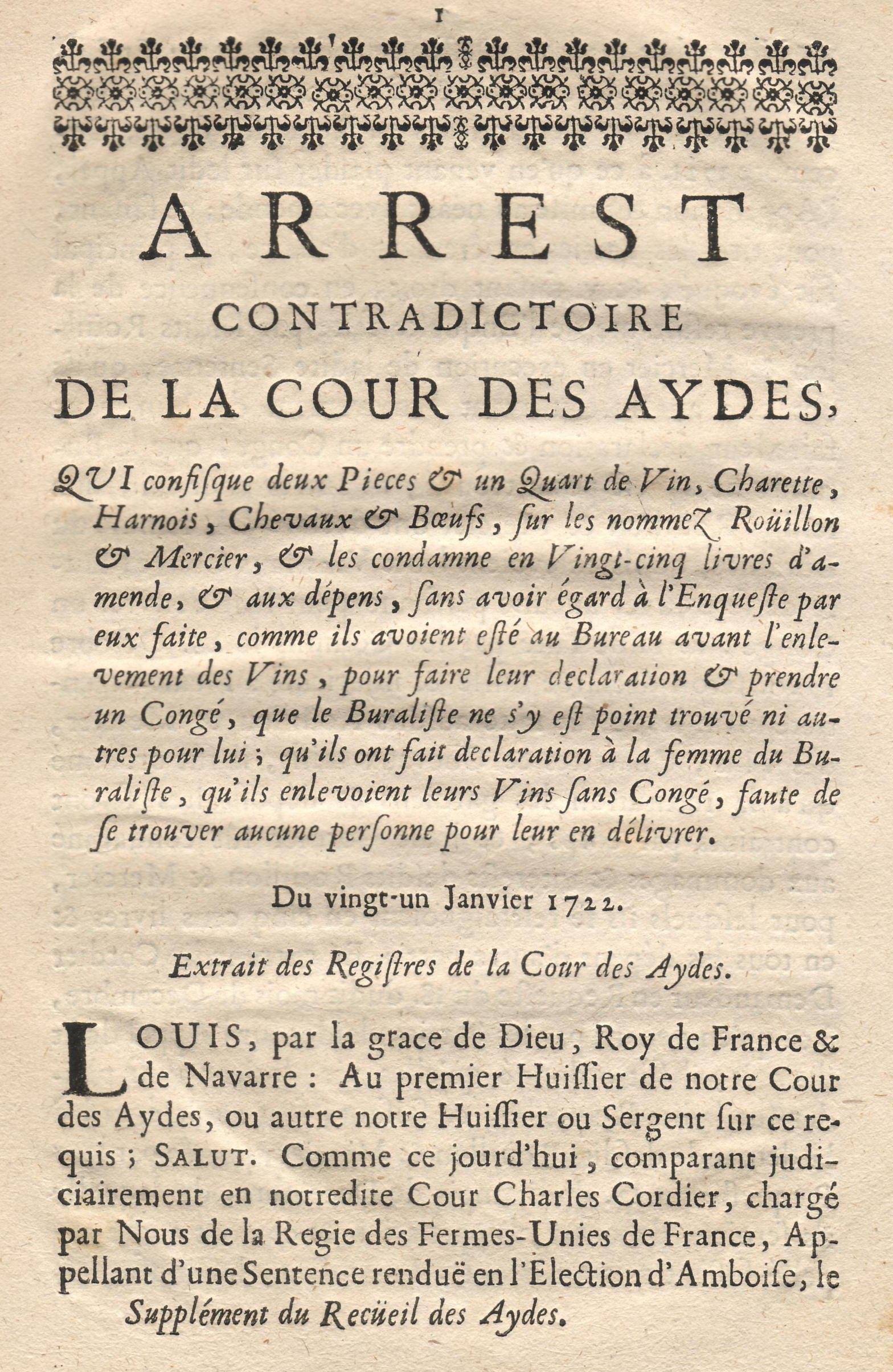
1722 ruling regarding absence on leave from the Amboise wine transportation

Two main factors contributed to the growth of Touraine wines between the 16th and 19th century. The first was a decree issued by the Paris parliament on 14 August 1577, forbidding Paris wine merchants to obtain their supplies from anywhere within twenty leagues (Note: Avant 1674, il s'agissait de l'ancienne lieue de Paris, d'une longueur de 3,248 mètres, soit une distance d'environ 65 km.) of the city. (Note: Interdiction annulée en 1776 par un édit royal.) Since the Loire Valley was easily accessible by road from the capital, demand rapidly increased firstly in the province of Orléanais, then in the province of Touraine. The second factor was the popularity of the Loire Valley's white wines with Dutch buyers. The latter installed agents, charged with overseeing their imports at close quarters, in several Loire Valley trading posts, including Amboise.

To all intents and purposes, the Dutch agents were middle-men, stocking and selling on French wines to the whole world and making a considerable profit in the process. Colbert (Louis XIV's finance minister) attempted to break their monopoly by creating a trading company that could deal directly with the markets. The Dutch retaliated by levying a heavy surcharge on various French manufactured articles, as well as French brandy and wine. Exports slowed down, with the regrettable result that the focus of production shifted from quality to quantity. A further undesirable effect was that cereal crops were often abandoned in favour of wine-growing, regardless of the land's suitability.

=== Contemporary history ===
At the start of the 19th century wine-growing became one of the mainstays of the local economy. For this reason the devastation caused by the dual scourge of mildew and phylloxera that hit the region in 1882 came as a particularly heavy blow. The extent of the damage was even greater because the wine-growers initially refused to pull up their vines, trying instead to treat them with carbon disulfide, though without success.

"As far as the phylloxera is concerned, the wine-growers were wrong, at the start, not to fight it.They allowed it to get completely out of hand. Nevertheless the wine-growers' unions have succeeded at many levels in keeping production at full capacity. In the Touraine area, however, there is no such flurry of activity. In his report to the General Council of the department of Indre-et-Loire, the Prefet (official in charge of a French department) does not even mention the situation. The general reaction is one of complete indifference. The local temperament militates against any attempt to take effective action, and at the same time political animosities are distracting everyone from the true problems of this region. However, the Touraine wine-growing area has already lost many vines and there are frequent cases of vines being pulled up. (Note: En fait près de la moitié des vignes seront arrachées) A vast fortune is disappearing". (Note: There is, however, a vine in the Touraine region, planted around 1850 and rediscovered in 1998, that successfully resisted phylloxera and is now probably the oldest vine in France.)

Following the introduction of new grape varieties, grafted onto American rootstocks, the vineyards were built up again between 1901 and 1905. In spite of these measures, the decline continued with a series of crises caused firstly by the collapse of stock market prices in 1906–1907, then by over-production in 1922–1923. It was only after the Second World War that the tide began to turn, thanks to improvements in quality due to the use of "noble" grape varieties, and increased demand for quality effervescent wines as an alternative to Champagne. The growth of tourism was also a crucial in boosting sales of the wine produced.

Award of AOC status

In 1954, the wine-growing area located around the Château d'Amboise, which was originally classed as part of the "Coteaux-de-Touraine" AOC by the decree passed on 24 December 1939, was granted its own appellation of Touraine-Amboise. The new appellation originally covered nine communes in the department of Indre-et-Loire, three on the left bank of the Loire (Amboise, Chargé and Mosnes) and six on the right bank (Cangey, Limeray, Pocé-sur-Cisse, Nazelles-Négron, Saint-Ouen-les-Vignes and Montreuil-en-Touraine). The commune of Saint-Règle (on the left bank) was added to the appellation by the decree of 2 August 2005. In 1967 the Commanderie des Grands Vins d'Amboise (the Order of the Great Wines of Amboise) was established to ensure that the wines were well promoted.

== Etymology ==
The etymological origins of the Touraine-Amboise appellation are relatively self-explanatory. It is made up of the name of the former province of Touraine (which derived its name from its Gallic inhabitants, the Turones (Note: Selon certaines sources, l'oppidum d'Amboise pourrait même avoir été la cité d'origine des Turones)), combined with the name of the town of Amboise, the most famous of the appellation's constituent communes.

== Geographical location ==
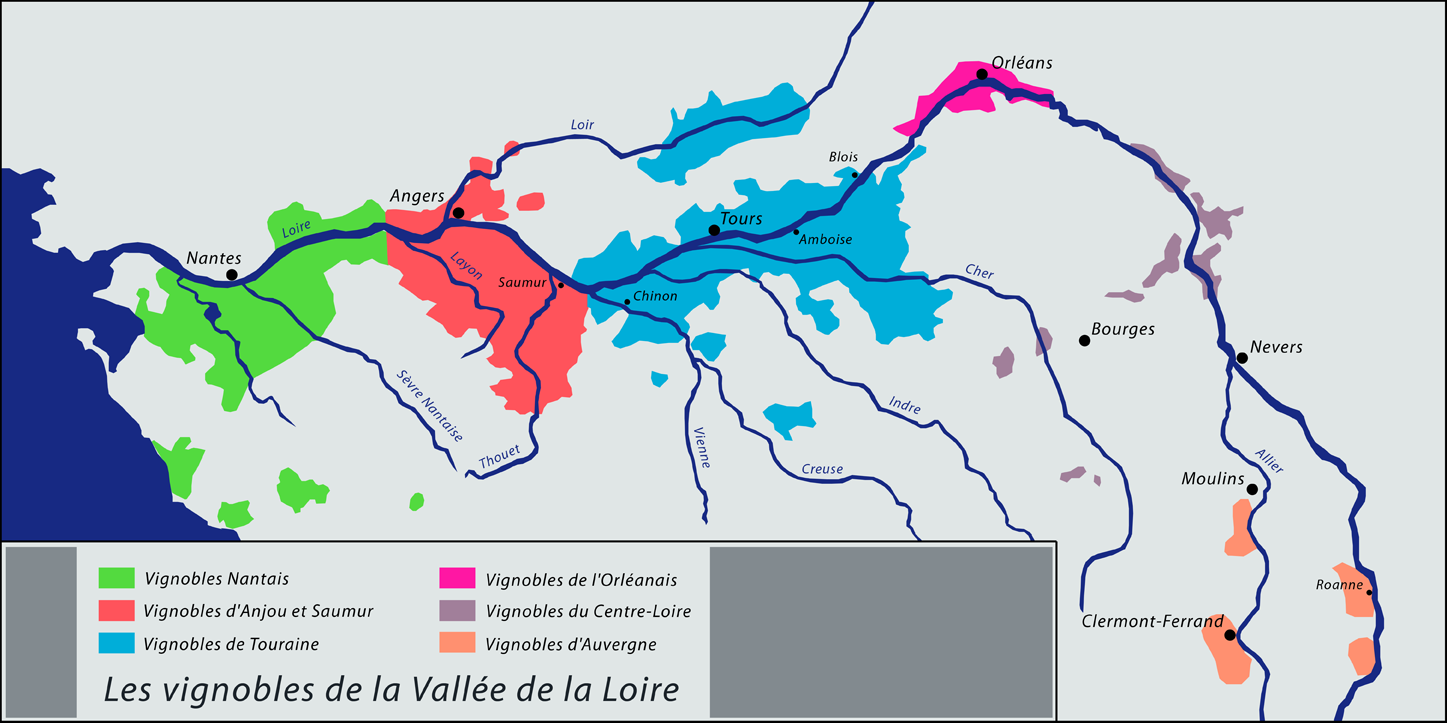
Wine-growing areas of the Loire Valley

=== Orography ===
The territory of the communes of the Touraine-Amboise AOC consists primarily of a plateau that lies between 105 and 130 metres above sea level. This is divided in two by the wide valley of the Loire, which lies, on average, at about 55 metres above sea level and is bordered on either side by often steeply sloping hillsides.

=== Geology ===
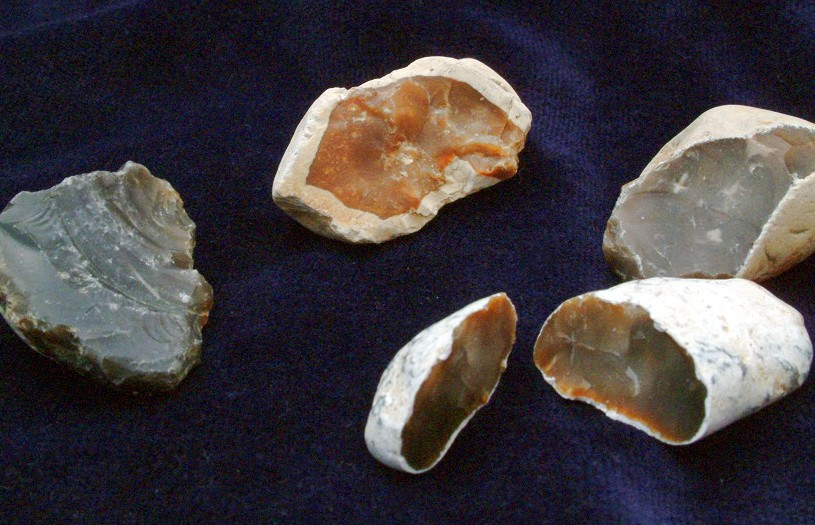
Different kinds of silex

The wide valley of the Loire is made up of a mixture of sand and silt that is carried along by the river. The slopes on either side are made up of a mixture of clays and other elements that have come down from the plateau areas. The wine-growing area is mainly located on the two-halves of the plateau and, occasionally, on the upper slopes to either side of the valley. The plateau areas are covered in a thin layer of clay-sand silt that has been deposited there by the wind. Beneath this silt lies a polygenetic puddingstone dating from the Upper Eocene Age, mixed with varicoloured clays and small pebbles of rolled silex, Jurassic cherts and quartz grains. The soils of this wine-growing terroir can be carbonate, overlying tuffeau stone on the higher slopes, or, more frequently, silicate and fairly heavy, overlying sands and clay gravels.

=== Climate ===
The Touraine wine-growing area is located at a point where marine and continental influences meet. A series of east–west facing valleys, where the continental influence is less harsh, present ideal conditions for the creation of microclimates that are especially favourable to wine-growing.

The nearest weather station with readings that can be accessed is in Tours.

Climate data for Touraine-Amboise
Month	Jan	Feb	Mar	Apr	May	Jun	Jul	Aug	Sep	Oct	Nov	Dec	Year
Mean daily maximum °F	44.4	46.8	52.3	57.7	64.6	71.1	76.3	75.7	70.5	62.1	50.9	45.3	59.7
Mean daily minimum °F	34.9	35.6	37.9	41.0	47.1	52.5	55.6	55.2	51.4	46.2	38.8	36.1	44.4
Average precipitation inches	2.49	2.43	2.14	2.02	2.66	1.87	2.09	1.61	2.14	2.40	2.48	2.59	26.92
Mean daily maximum °C	6.9	8.2	11.3	14.3	18.1	21.7	24.6	24.3	21.4	16.7	10.5	7.4	15.4
Mean daily minimum °C	1.6	2.0	3.3	5.0	8.4	11.4	13.1	12.9	10.8	7.9	3.8	2.3	6.9
Average precipitation mm	63.3	61.6	54.3	51.4	67.5	47.5	53.0	40.9	54.3	61.0	63.0	65.9	683.7
Source: Infoclimat : Tours

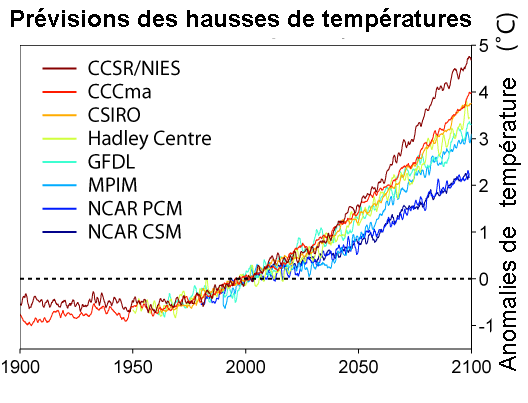

Possible consequences of global warming According to the conclusions of two studies published in the United States (one of which was conducted by the Colmar branch of l'INRA (Institut National de Recherche Agronomique or French National Institute for Agricultural Research) on the consequences of global warming for wine-growing, the Loire Valley wine-growing area should be one of the prime beneficiaries of the gradual increase in temperatures. Basing their calculations on Sotheby's auction statistics, these studies suggest that in the last ten years the optimum temperature for producing quality wine has already been reached in most French wine-growing areas, but that there is a margin for potential improvement of about 0.8 °C along the banks of the Loire. If these conclusions are right, the wines of this region could, in fact, reach their peak without the need for any changes in the grape varieties grown.

== Wine-growing area ==
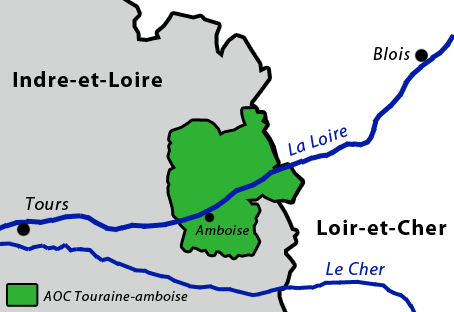
Map of the Touraine-Amboise AOC area

=== Profile ===
The wine-growing area, which is located in the department of Indre-et-Loire, covers the communes of Amboise, Chargé, Mosnes, Cangey, Limeray, Pocé-sur-Cisse, Nazelles-Négron, Saint-Ouen-les-Vignes, Montreuil-en-Touraine and Saint-Règle.

It extends over 220 hectares (540 acres) and produces 9,000 hectolitres a year, of which 60% goes into red wines, 30% into rosé wines and 10% into white wines.

=== Grape varieties grown ===
- Red and rosé wines: a blend of Cabernet Franc, known locally as "Breton", Cabernet Sauvignon, (Note: Cabernet Sauvignon is tolerated until the 2010 harvest in a proportion of up to 10%) Côt and Gamay noir. The Cuvée François 1er (François I vintage) is a wine that can only be produced by the wine-growers of the Touraine-Amboise AOC. It is a blend of Gamay, Cabernet and Côt grape varieties.
- Whites wines, still and effervescent (traditional method): Chenin blanc, known locally as "Pineau de la Loire".
- Crémants de Loire (sparking wines produced using traditional methods): a blend of Chenin blanc and Chardonnay with the addition of small amounts of Cabernet Franc and Pinot noir.

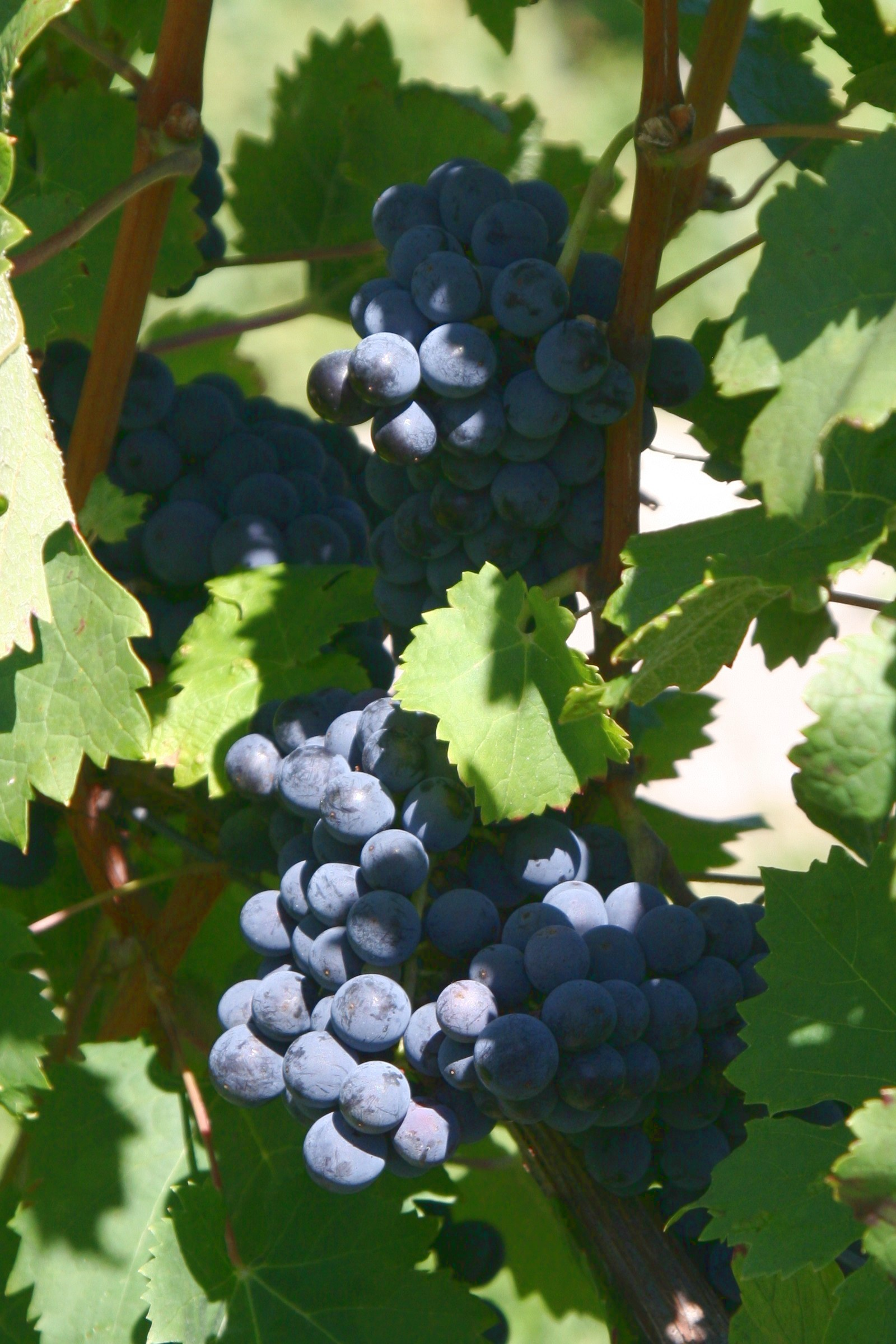
Cabernet Franc

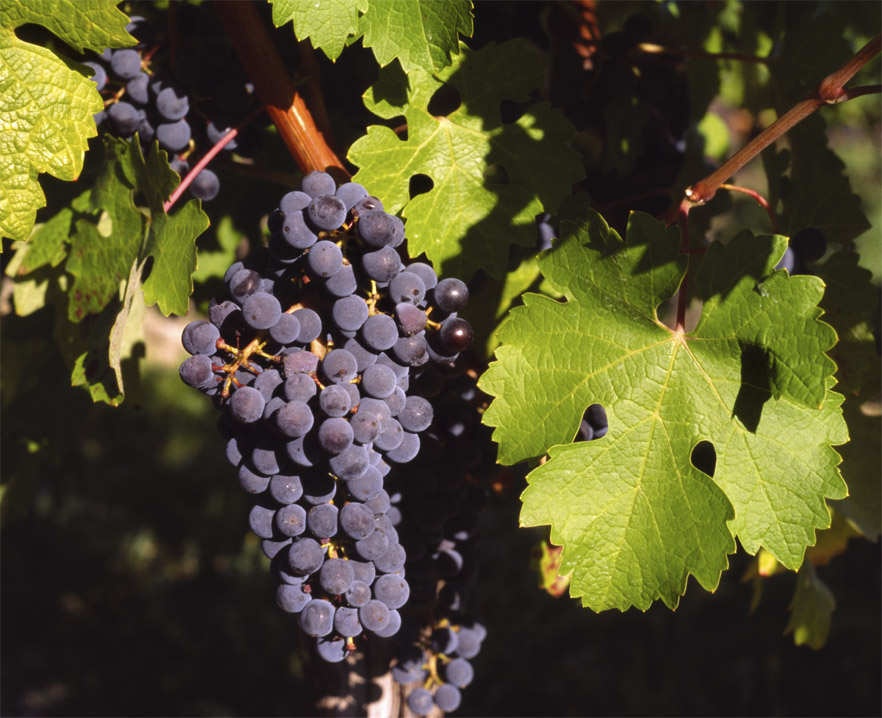
Cabernet Sauvignon

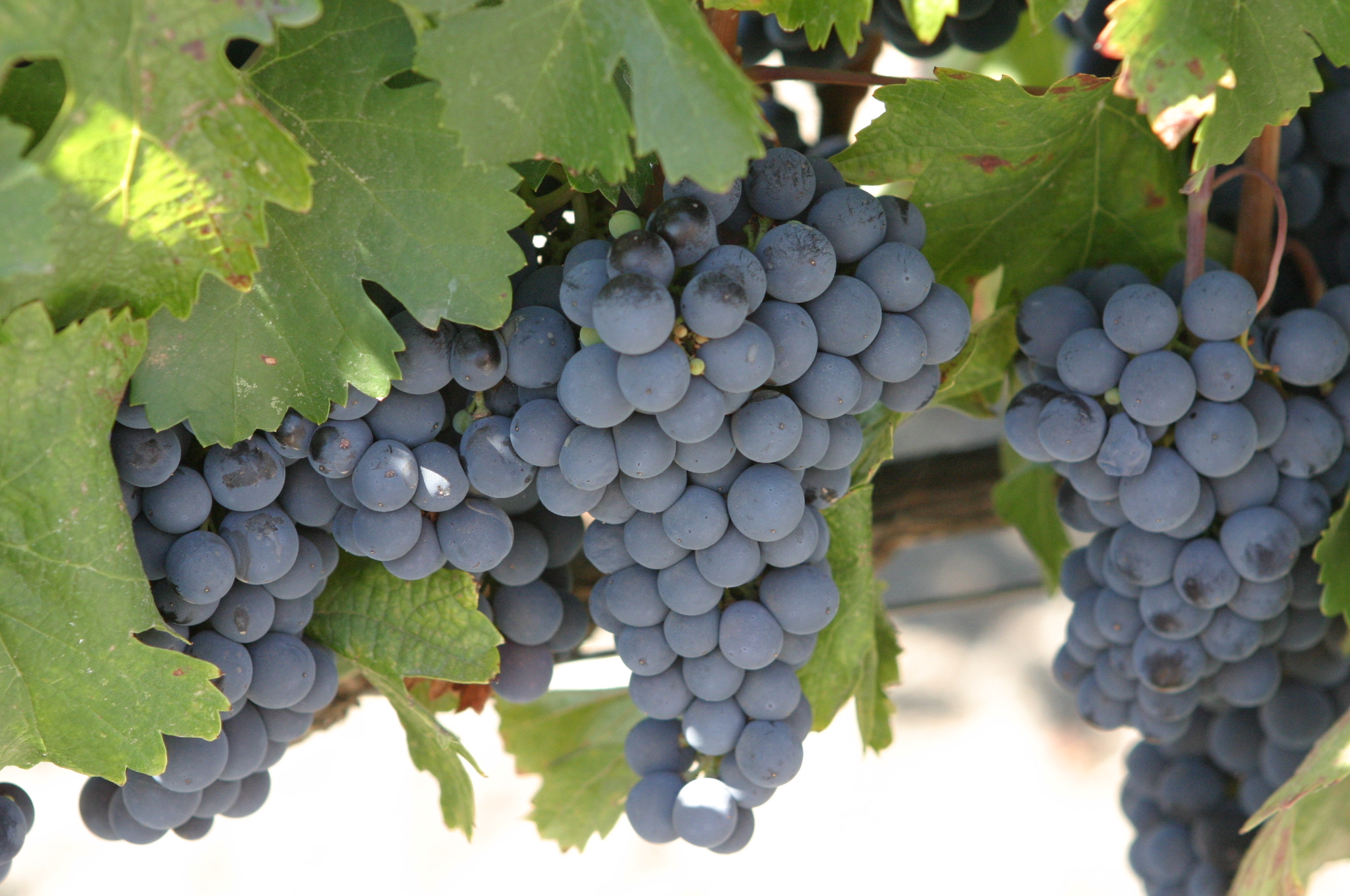
Côt

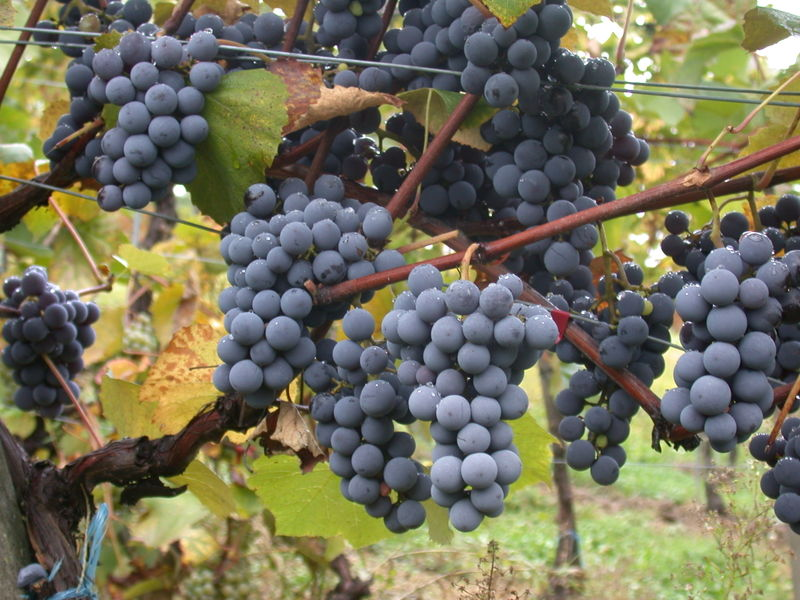
Gamay
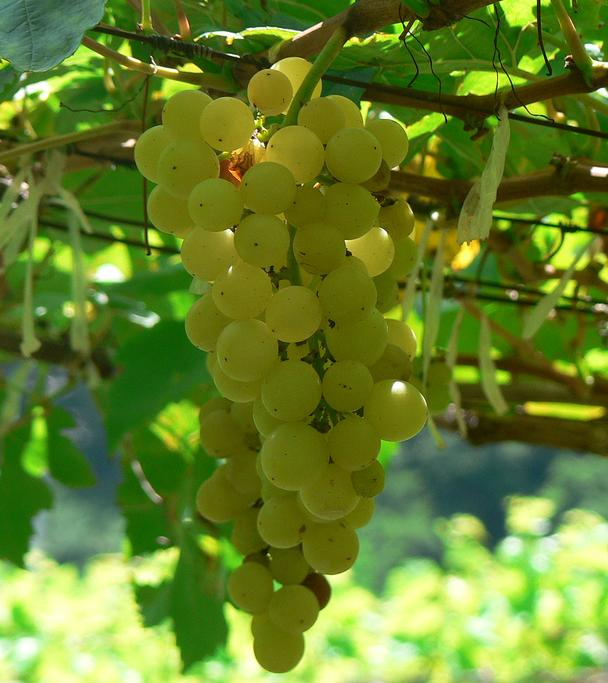
Chenin blanc

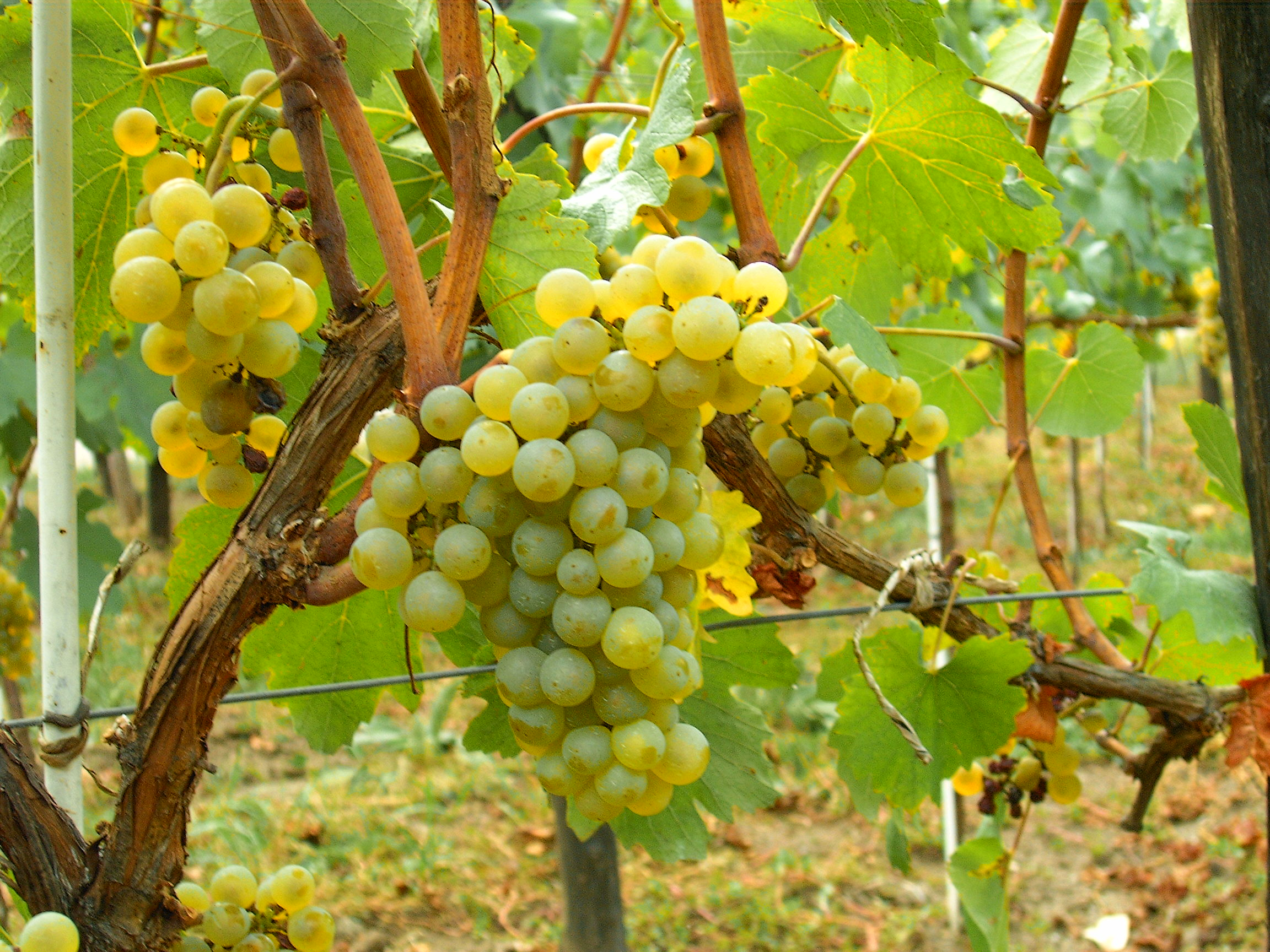
Chardonnay

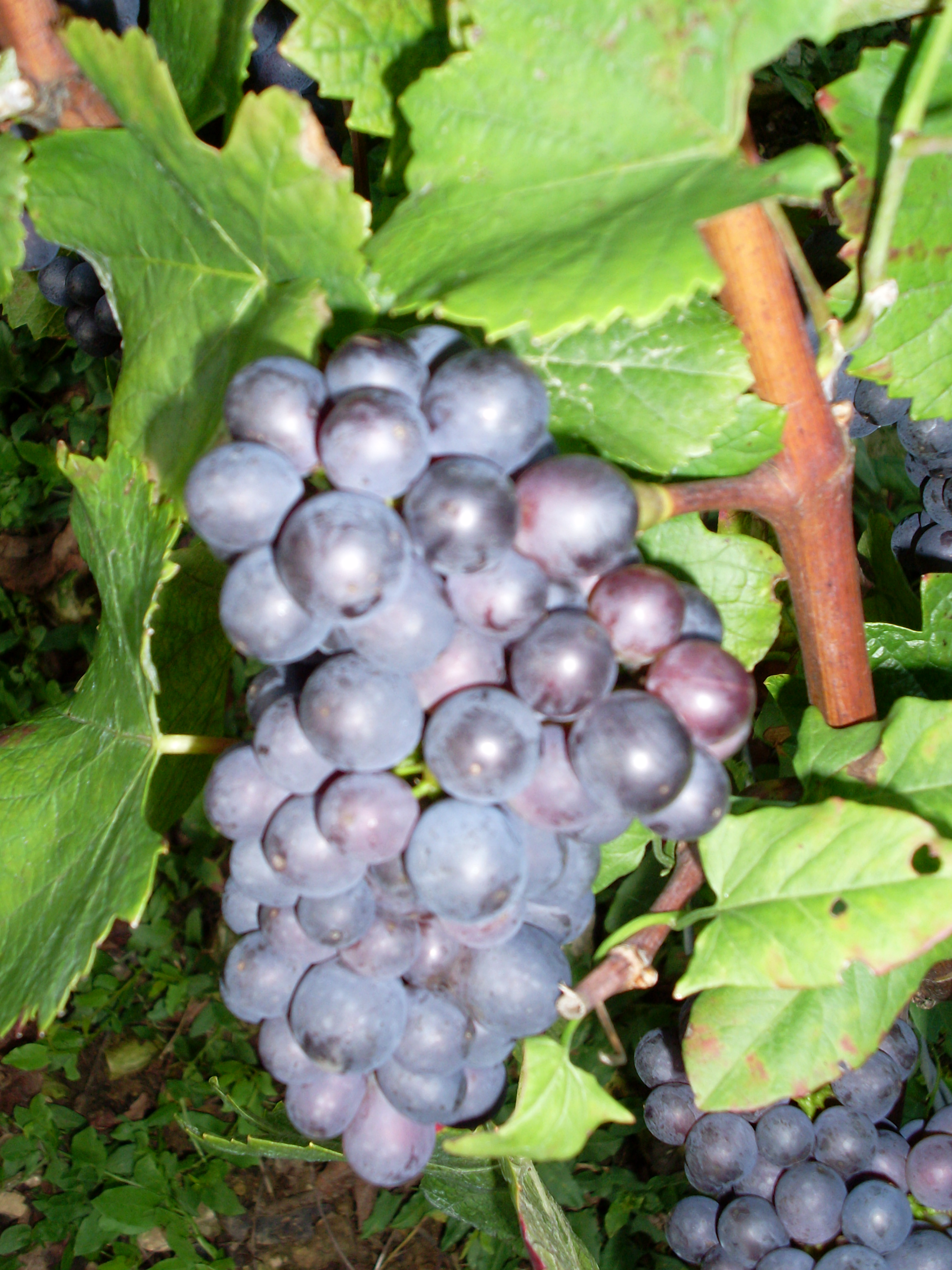
Pinot noir

=== Cultivation methods ===
==== Planting ====
The density of planting must be at least 4,500 vines per hectare, the maximum distance between rows being 2.1 metres. The bottom wire of the trellis must be no more than 0.55 metres above the ground. The AOC status only applies to wines produced from the harvest gathered two years after the year in which the vines were planted (before 31 August).

==== Pruning ====
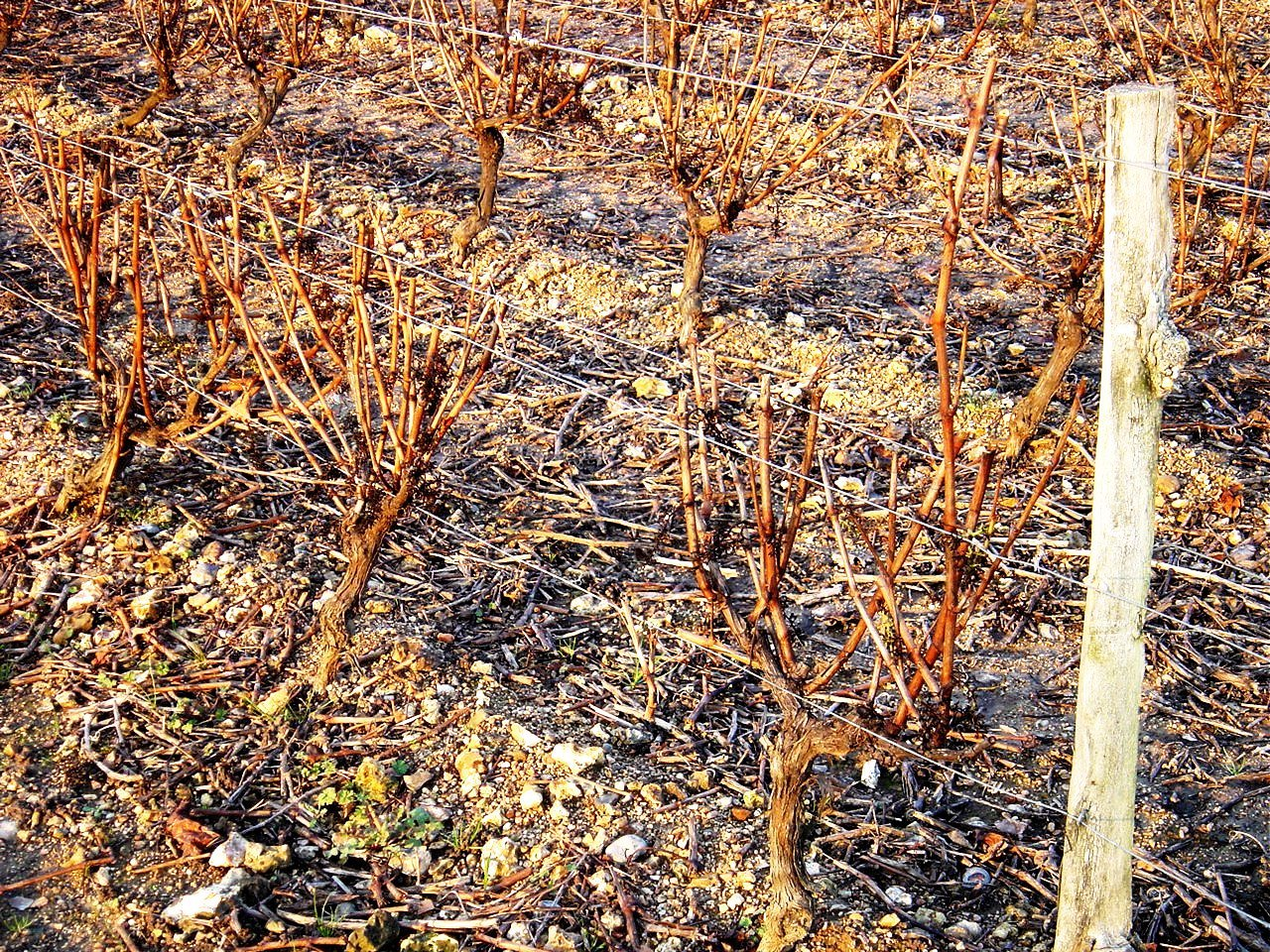
Vines that have undergone mechanized pre-pruning

Pruning generally takes place once the leaves have fallen in November, and continues throughout the winter months. Mechanized pre-pruning is carried out first, using a high-clearance tractor, and this cuts the time spent pruning manually by about a quarter. The following pruning methods are permitted:

- The so-called "Guyot simple" or "Single Guyot" pruning: a single cane with five to eight buds and a single spur with one to three buds, the maximum total of renewal buds allowed per vine being eleven;
- The Taille à trois bras or Three-armed pruning: a long branch with a maximum of seven renewal buds, and spurs, each with a maximum of three renewal buds, totalling no more than eleven renewal buds per vine.
- The Taille courte or Short pruning: spurs bearing a maximum of three renewal buds and one optional spur bearing four renewal buds, the total number of renewal buds allowed per vine being no more than thirteen.

The numbers of buds stipulated above apply to vines spaced up to one metre apart within the row. The number of buds per vine may be increased by one renewal bud for every 0.2 metres of additional spacing.

Pruning has become less strenuous and time-consuming since the introduction of electric and pneumatic secateurs. The cuttings produced by pruning are shredded to form a mulch or burnt in situ. Pruning and trellising are the only tasks that wine-growers still carry out completely by hand.

==== Cultivation ====
The work of cultivation falls into two main categories:

- Mechanized operations, such as ploughing, which aerates the soil and helps to keep down the weeds, and hedging, which removes the upper sections of the shoots in order to increase the vines' exposure to the sun and make them less susceptible to disease.
- Chemical treatments, using pesticides and herbicides, in order to protect the vines against cryptogamic diseases such as mildew, oidium, grey rot, etc., and against insects such as the Eudemis and the Cochylis. Every effort is made to minimize the environmental effects of these procedures.
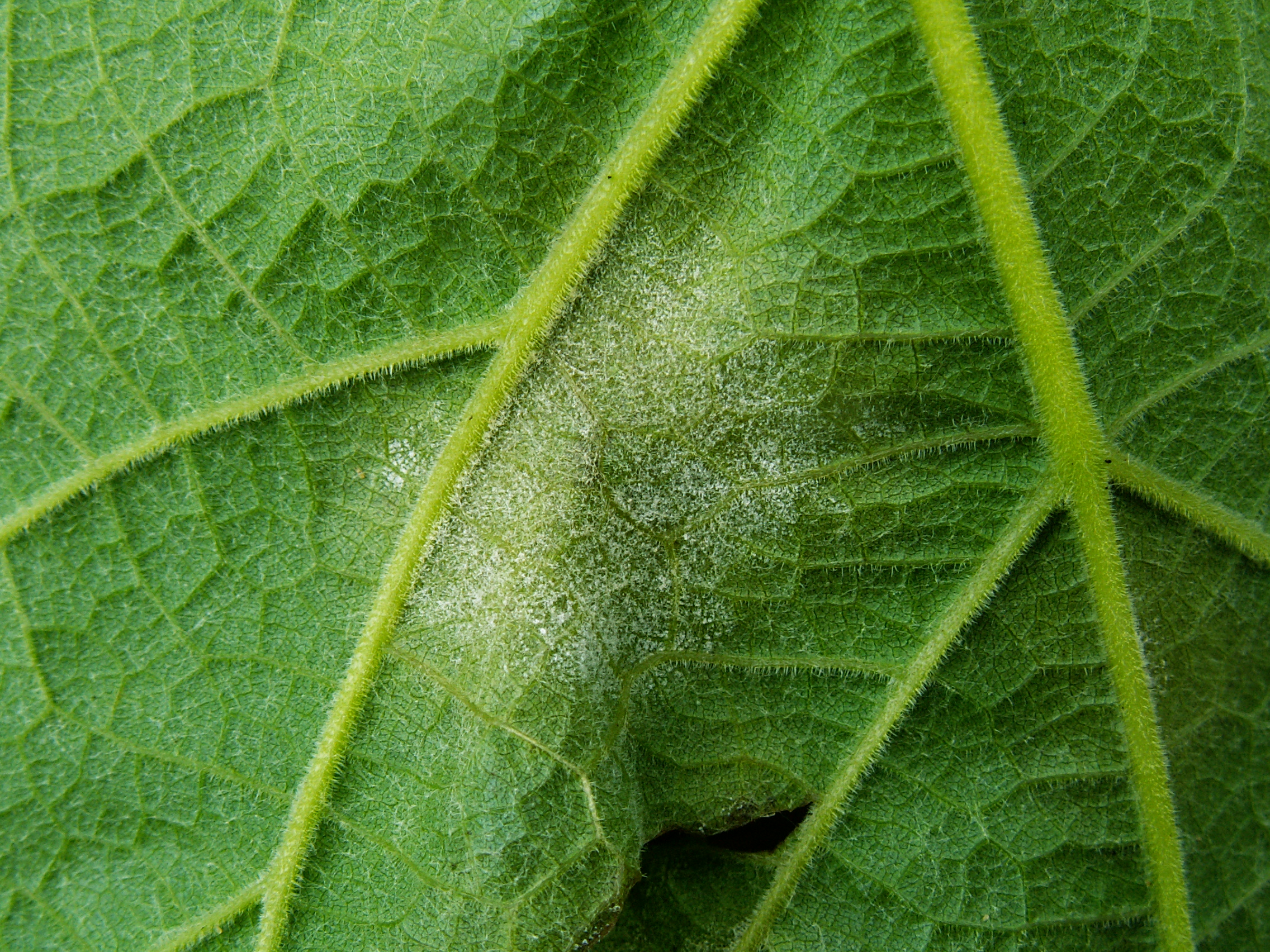
Mildew

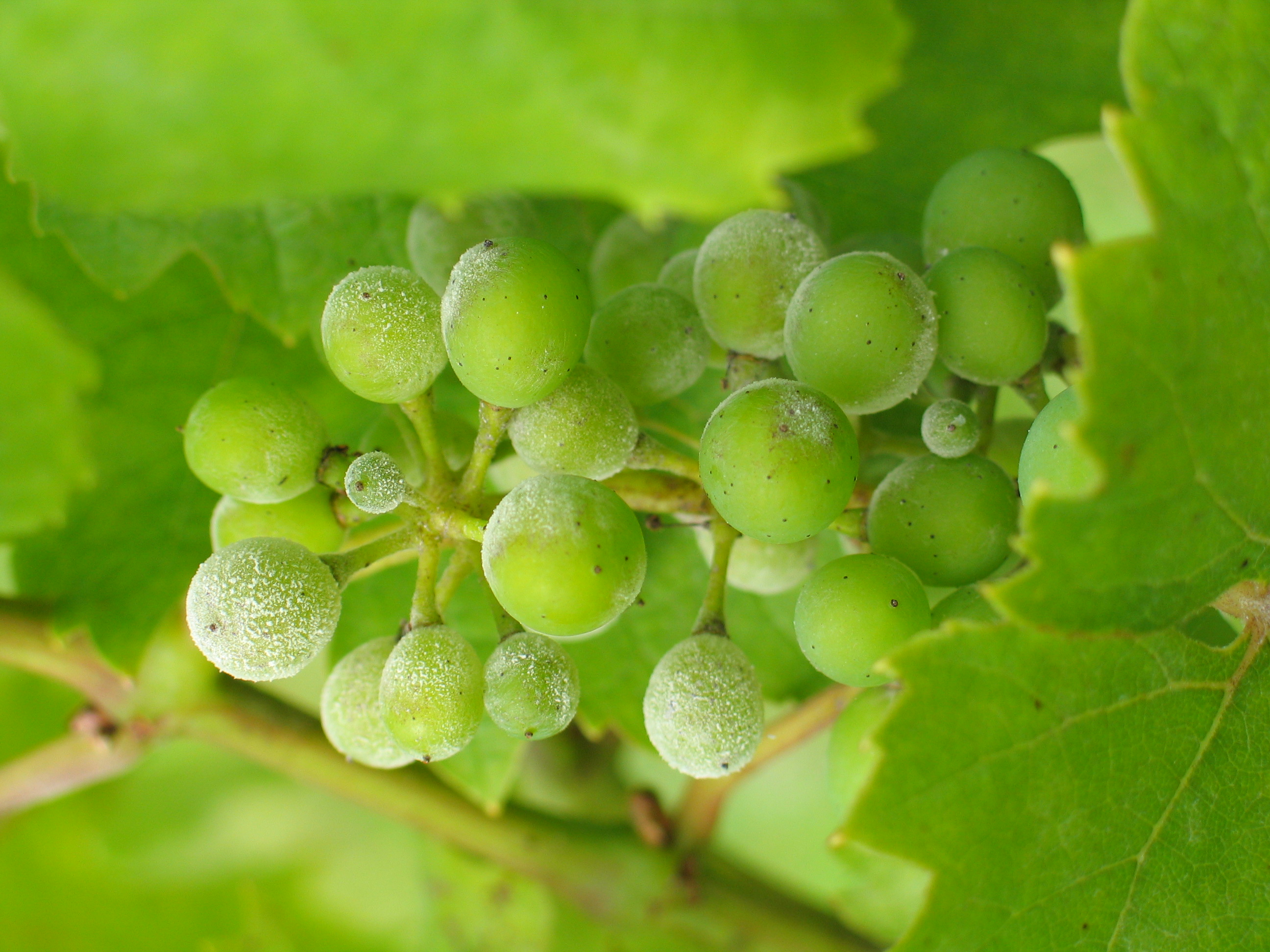
Oidium

==== Harvesting ====
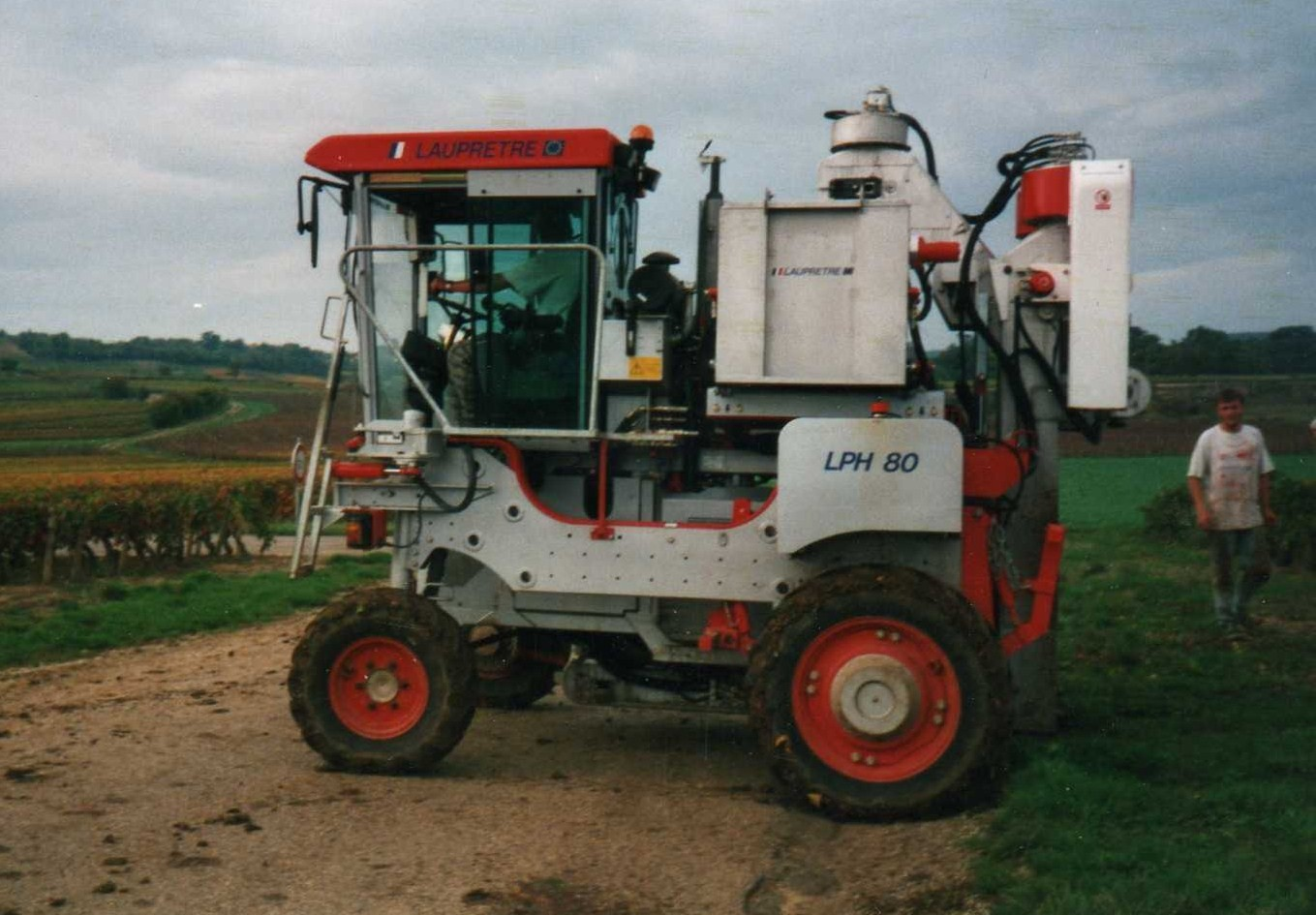
Grape Harvester

The harvest usually begins in the second week of September and continues through to the first weeks of October. Over the last fifteen years or so, the use of mechanized harvesters has become increasingly common, especially since virtually all the wine-growing area lies on level ground. As a result, manual harvesting has virtually died out.

==== Wine-making and maturing ====
The following are the usual wine-making methods employed. However, it should be remembered that there can be slight variations in the methods used by individual wine-makers within the AOC.

===== Red wine-making =====
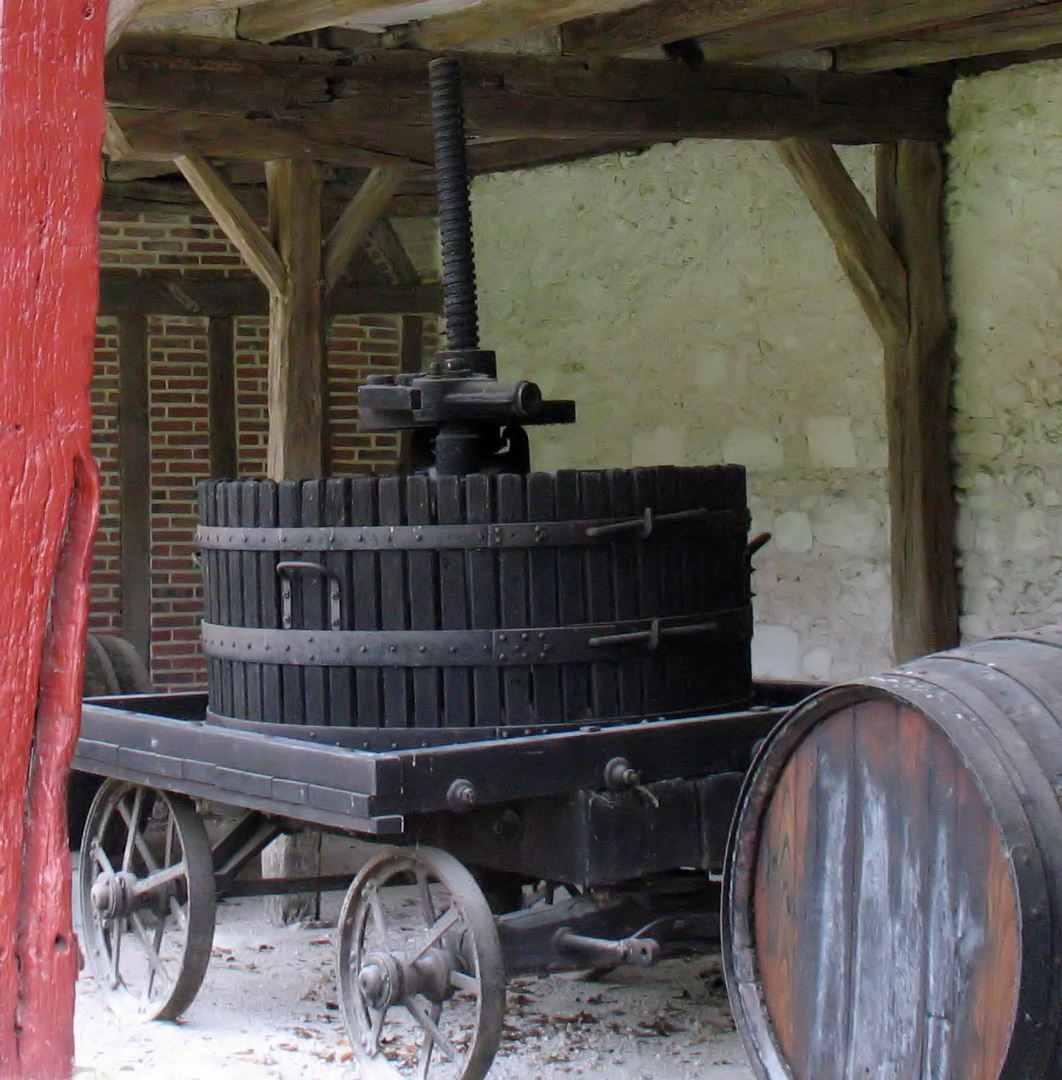
Old press from the Touraine region in the Château de Chenonceau

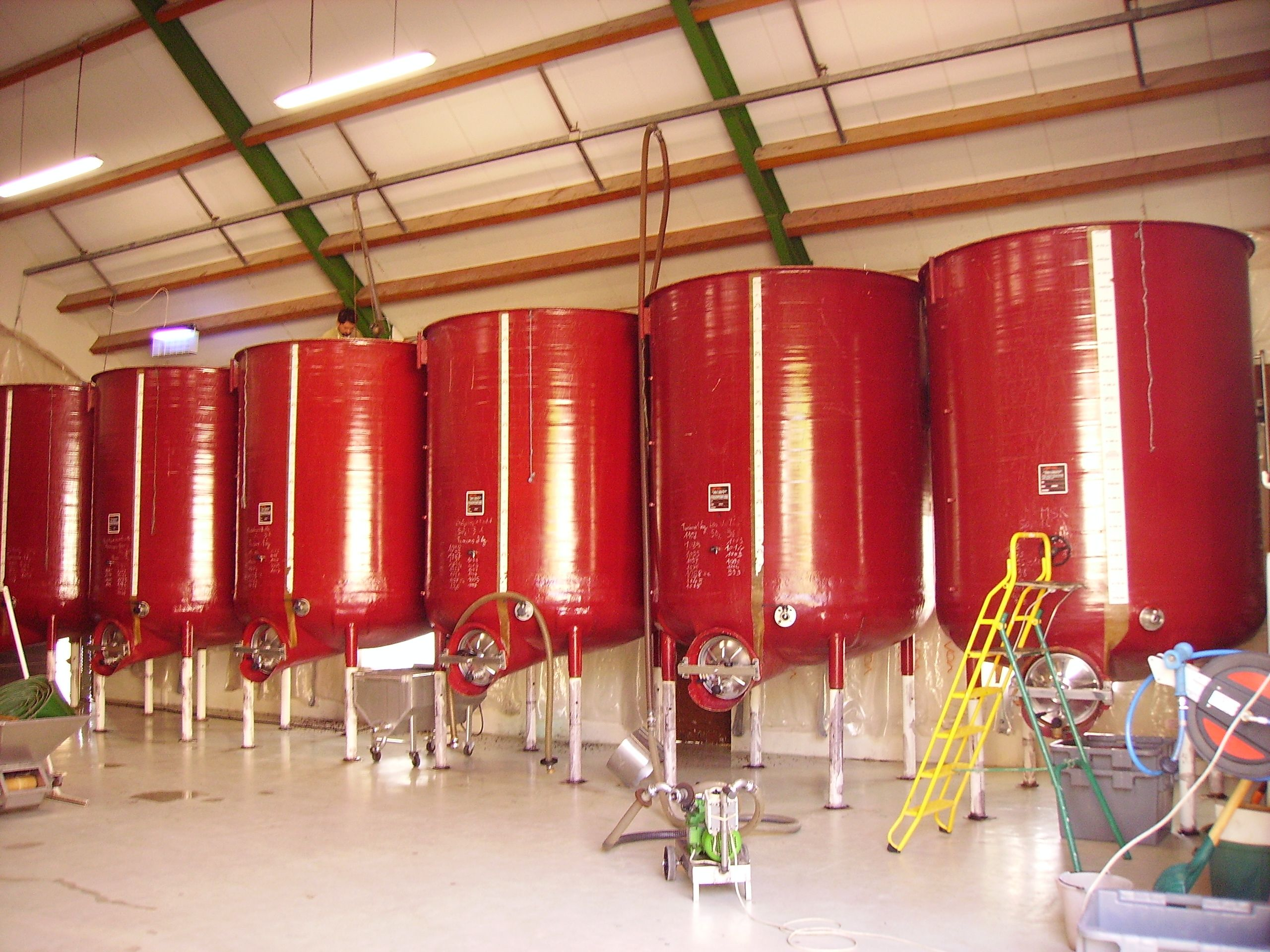
Fermentation tanks

The grapes are harvested, either manually or by machine, when they are fully ripe. Sometimes grapes that have been harvested manually are sorted, either on the vines or at a sorting table on the wine-maker's premises, to ensure that rotten or insufficiently ripe grapes are removed. Grapes that have been harvested manually are usually crushed, then transferred to a tank. Pre-fermentation cold maceration is sometimes carried out. Alcoholic fermentation can then begin, normally after the addition of yeast. The next stage is the extraction of polyphenols (tannins and anthocyanins) and other chemical constituents of the grapes. In the past this was carried out by a process called pigeage, which involved repeatedly pushing the floating cap of grape solids back down into the fermenting juice. Now, however, extraction is normally brought about by a series of remontages. This involves pumping the juice from the bottom of the tank, then pouring it over the cap of grape solids to wash out the grapes' distinctive constituents. The temperature for alcoholic fermentation can be varied, but the normal average temperature at the height of fermentation is between 28 and 35 degrees Celsius. If the naturally generated temperature is too low, chaptalization may be carried out. This practice is subject to external regulations. Once alcoholic fermentation has finished, the liquid is removed from the tank and separated into free-run wine and press wine. Malolactic fermentation may take place next, but is dependent on temperature. The wine is drawn off and stored in barrels or vats to be matured. The maturing process takes several months (six to twenty-four months), after which the wine is fined, filtered and bottled.

===== Rosé wine-making =====
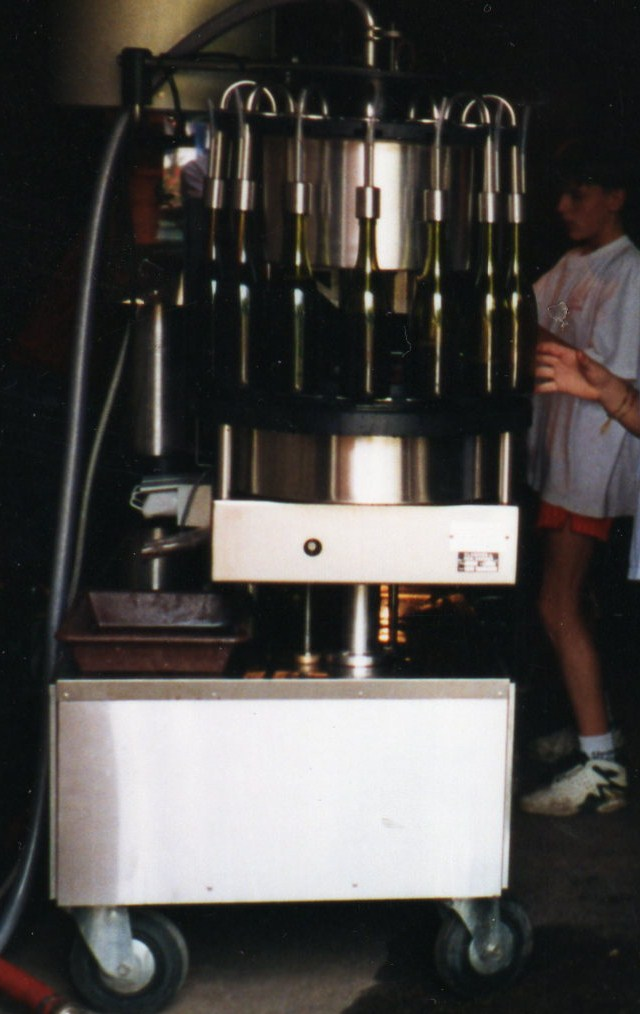
Bottling machine

Harvesting is manual or mechanized. Two different methods may be used, either the direct pressing method (to produce a pressed rosé wine) or the method whereby the harvested red grapes are put in a tank and red wine maceration begins, but some of the juice is then bled off (to produce a bled rosé wine). Alcoholic fermentation takes place in tanks, as for white wine, and temperatures, chaptalization, etc. are carefully controlled. This is followed by malolactic fermentation. The wine is matured in vats, or sometimes in barrels. Lastly, the wine is filtered and bottled.

===== White wine-making =====
As with red wine-making, harvesting is manual or mechanized, and may include sorting. The grapes are then transferred into a press to be pressed. Once the grape must is in the tank, the sludge is removed, normally after certain enzymes have been added. At this stage pre-fermentation cold stabulation (at temperatures between 10 and 12 °C for several days) may be carried out in order to promote the extraction of aromas. Normally, however, after 12 to 48 hours, the clear juice is drawn off and left to ferment. Alcoholic fermentation continues under supervision, particular attention being paid to the temperature, which must remain more or less stable (between 18 and 24 degrees Celsius). If necessary, chaptalization is also carried out in order to boost the alcoholic strength by volume. Malolactic fermentation and maturing then take place in barrels or in vats. Once this process is completed, the wine is filtered in order to clarify it. The final stage of the whole operation is the bottling of the wine.

=== Yields ===
The minimum and maximum yields for the AOC, stipulated by the decree of 12 July 1994, are as follows:

Yield per hectare	Red	Rose	White	Sparkling
Performance Based	55 hl/ha	55 hl/ha	60 hl/ha	78 hl/ha
Return target	67 hl/ha	67hl/ha	70 hl/ha	78 hl/ha

=== Minimum and maximum alcoholic strength by volume ===
The Touraine-Amboise AOC wines must come from well-ripened grape harvests and must have the following natural alcoholic strengths by volume:

alcohol by volume	Red	Rose	White	Sparkling
Minimal	9.5% vol	9.5% vol	10% vol	8.5% vol
Maximum	12.5% vol	12.5% vol	12.5% vol	12.5% vol

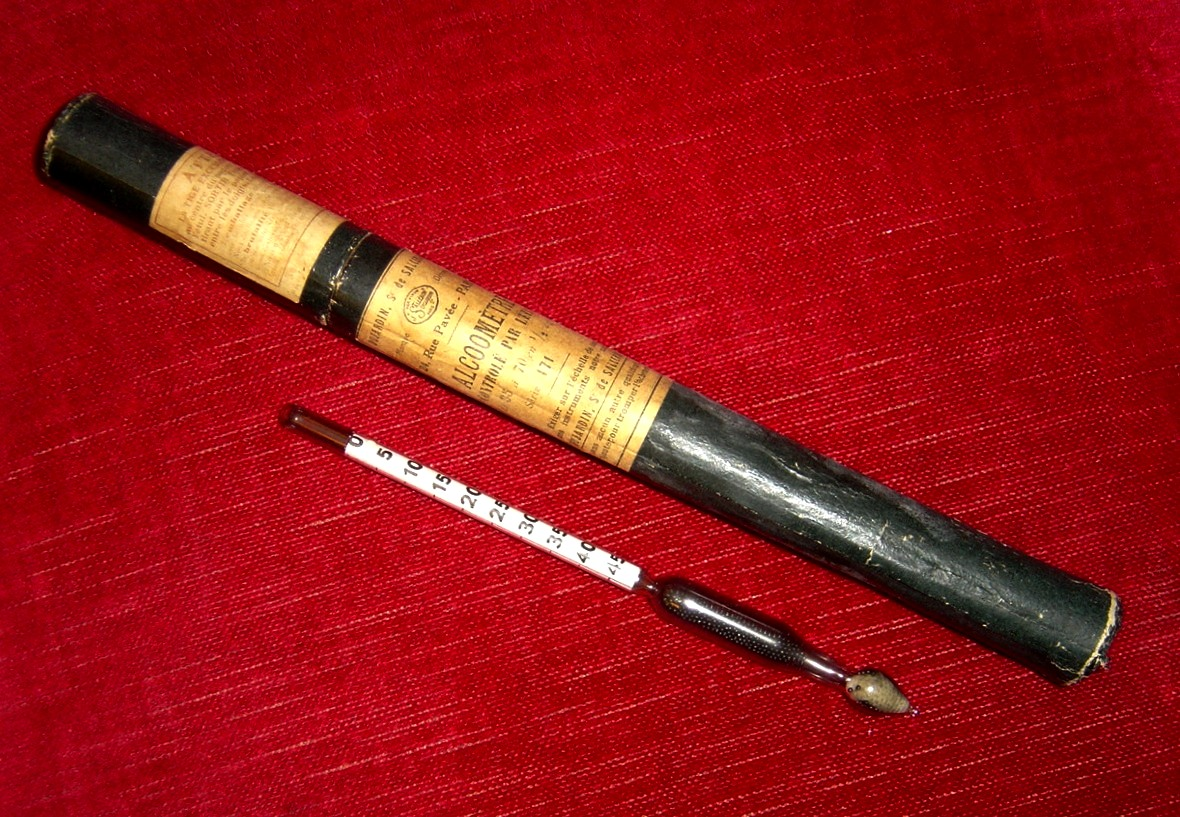
Early 20th century alcohol meter

The upper limit may be exceeded, provided the wine has been made without enrichment of any kind, and provided an investigation by the INAO has been requested by the wine-grower, carried out and filed prior to the harvesting of the vines in question. These limits may be adjusted in line with changing climate conditions.

Even when enrichment with dry sugar (chaptalization) has been authorized, a maximum total alcoholic strength by volume of 12.5% may not be exceeded.

==== Sugar content ====
The Touraine-Amboise AOC wines cannot be considered properly matured if their sugar content is less than 153 grams per litre of must. For sparkling white wines the amount should be 136 grams per litre of must.

=== Terroir and wines ===
The soil is made up of alternating perruches and aubuis soils, as they are called in French. Perruches are clays combined with silica, which warm up quickly and are the reason why these wines have a flinty taste. Aubuis are a mixture of permeable, fertile, calcareous clays, which give the wine its powerful character and are perfectly suited to white grape varieties.

=== Business structure ===
One of the features of this AOC is the large number of small family concerns, despite the gradual disappearance of very small plots farmed by retired people or those in paid employment, for whom wine production was only a means of supplementing their main income.

=== Type of wine and gastronomy ===
==== Types of wines ====
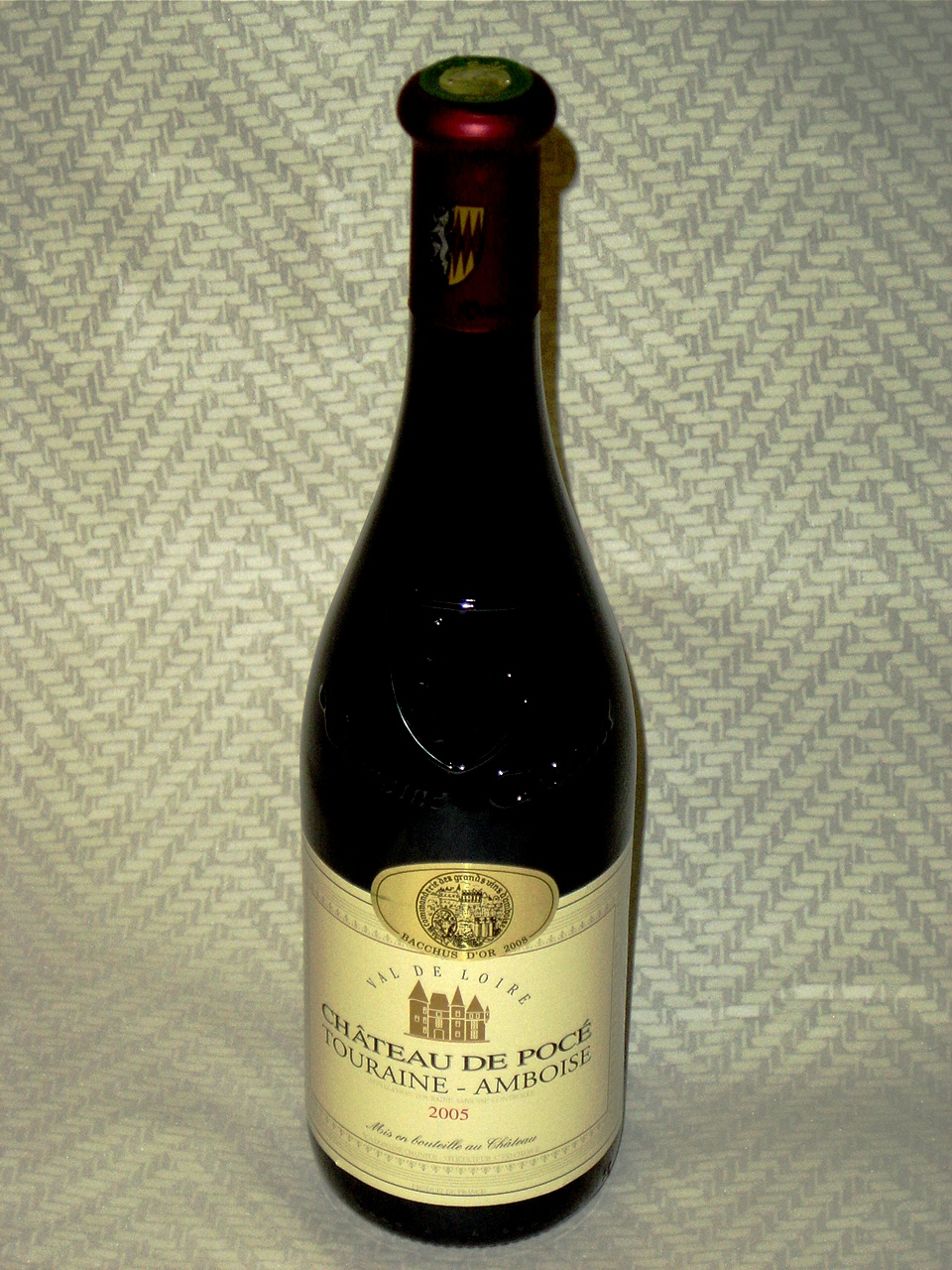
Bottle of Touraine-Amboise wine awarded a Golden Bacchus

- The red wines are fruity and balanced with depth of colour. They should be served at between 14 °C and 16 °C and can be used as an accompaniment to game, meats and cheeses. They can be kept on average for 2 to 5 years, longer for batches that have been aged in oak barrels.
- The rosé wines come from the same grape varieties as the red wines, but have a shorter maceration period and are bottled very much sooner. They have aromas of small red fruits, and should be served at between 10 °C and 12 °C. They complement starters and grilled meats.
- The still white wines are either dry, medium dry, or medium sweet, depending on the amount of sunshine the grapes have absorbed. They have a supple, sometimes dense taste, with fresh fruit and citrus aromas. The dry wines should be served at 10 °C with fish and seafood, while the medium dry wines are better suited to fish prepared with a sauce or to cooked and cured meats. The medium sweet wines go particularly well with foie gras and desserts. Alternatively they can be served as an aperitif. On average they can be kept for between 2 and 5 years.

Touraine AOC wines

- The effervescent wines carry the double designation of "Méthode Traditionnelle" (produced by traditional methods), which means that they are very fruity and ideal for the preparation of kirs, and "Crémant de Loire" (or sparkling wine from the Loire region) which makes them the ideal way to end a meal.

=== Marketing ===
Marketing is largely carried out directly by the wine-growers from their wine cellars that are usually hollowed out of the local tuffeau rock, and by the Cellier Léonard de Vinci (Leonardo da Vinci Wine Cellar) in Limeray, a winemaking cooperative set up in 1931 by Charles Bellamy and some local wine-growers under the name "Cave des vignerons de Limeray" (Limeray Wine-growers Cellar), and renamed in 1995. Customer sales are managed by the Caveau des vignerons d'Amboise (Amboise Wine-growers Vault), located immediately below the Château of Amboise, as well as by various shops in Amboise and the surrounding towns.

Wine fairs are organized on a regular basis at Easter and in the week of 15 August (the Feast of the Assumption is a public holiday in France), and are held in a tunnel dug out of the tuffeau rock beneath the Château of Amboise.

The first or second Sunday of July is reserved for a gourmet walk of about 5 km around the vineyards of the village of Limeray. The walk is in aid of humanitarian causes and is organized with the help of the Lions Club of Amboise les Deux Vallées. This gives the wine-growers, in conjunction with the Commanderie des Grans Vins d'Amboise (the Order of the Great Wines of Amboise) and the region's gastronomical guilds, an opportunity to showcase local wines and other specialities from the Touraine region.

== The Order of the Great Wines of Amboise ==
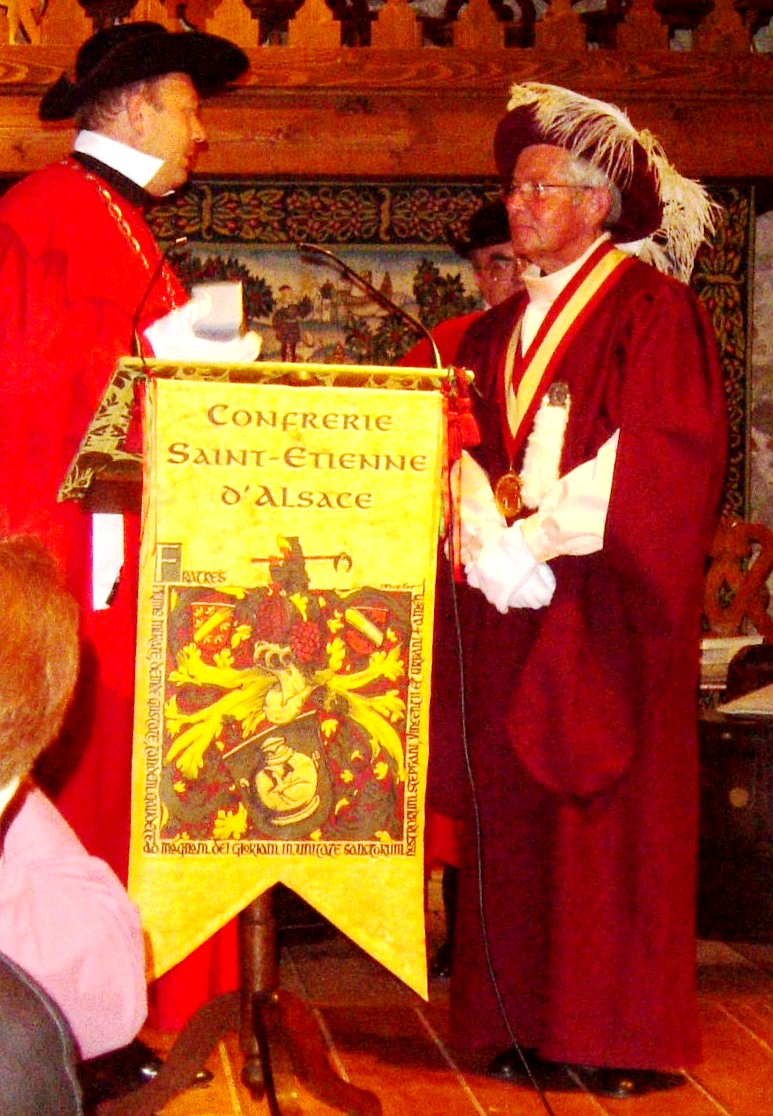
The Order of the Great Wines of Amboise being welcomed at a reception given by Alsace's Saint-Etienne Guild.

La Commanderie des Grands Vins d'Amboise (the Order of the Great Wines of Amboise) is a guild for the promotion of fine wines founded on 15 April 1967 by a team of wine-growers who were backed by Michel Debré, honorary president of the Syndicat des Vins de Touraine Amboise (Touraine-Amboise wine-growers' union).

The Order derives its name from an order of the Hospitaller Knights of St John of Jerusalem, (Note: Elle avait pour nom exact « Commanderie de Saint-Jean de l'Isle-lès-Amboise ») who were based on the Ile d'Or (Note: Anciennement appelée île saint-Jean du fait de la présence de cette commanderie) (Island of Gold), at the foot of the Château of Amboise, during the Middle Ages. The Order has as its motto Nos Roys l'ont aymé (mediaeval French for "Our kings loved it"), a reference to Louis XI's charter decreeing that Amboise wine should be sold before all other kinds at the market in Tours. The order's purpose is to promote wines from the Touraine-Amboise appellation area in Europe and throughout the world.

Under the terms of a ministerial order issued on 11 August 2003 , the Order is one of ten French guilds for the promotion of fine wines that are authorized to confer competition prize-winning honours, in this case "Bacchus d'Or" (Golden Bacchus), on still wines.

Traditionally the Order holds two chapter meetings each year:

- The rotating chapter in honour of St Vincent, patron saint of wine-growers, which moves between each of the ten communes of the appellation in turn. At this chapter meeting the most long-standing and most well-deserving wine-growers in the village are honoured.
- The harvest chapter meeting, held in the Croix-Douillard wine cellars in Amboise, at which wine-growers can be enthroned at their own request.

== Touraine-Amboise wines in French literature ==
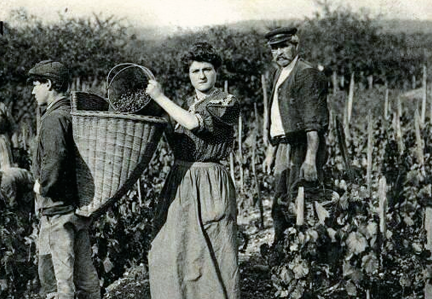
Harvesting in Mélie's time

The writer of regional literature, Robert Morin (1893–1925) was the author of Mélie Buttelière ('Mélie the Basket Carrier'), which was published posthumously in 1926. In the 1920s Morin lived in the Ménard manor house at Pocé-sur-Cisse. His heroine, Mélie, lived halfway up a hillside in a cave dwelling between the hamlets of Fourchette and Moncé in Limeray, right in the heart of the present AOC wine-growing area. Her job was to carry the soil washed down the hillsides by the rain back up the slopes again, earthing up the base of each vine. The small basket she used was known locally as a buttelet, and is the root of the word buttelière (basket carrier), Mélie's job title. By depicting a few brief scenes from her existence, the author painted a vivid picture of the lives and characterful speech of the local wine-growing community in the early 20th century.

== Notes and references ==
=== Bibliography ===
- de la Croix, Robert (1979). Les vins de Loire et les vins du Jura. Éditions Montalba. ISBN 978-2-85870-016-5.
