= Neuillé-le-Lierre =

- Commune
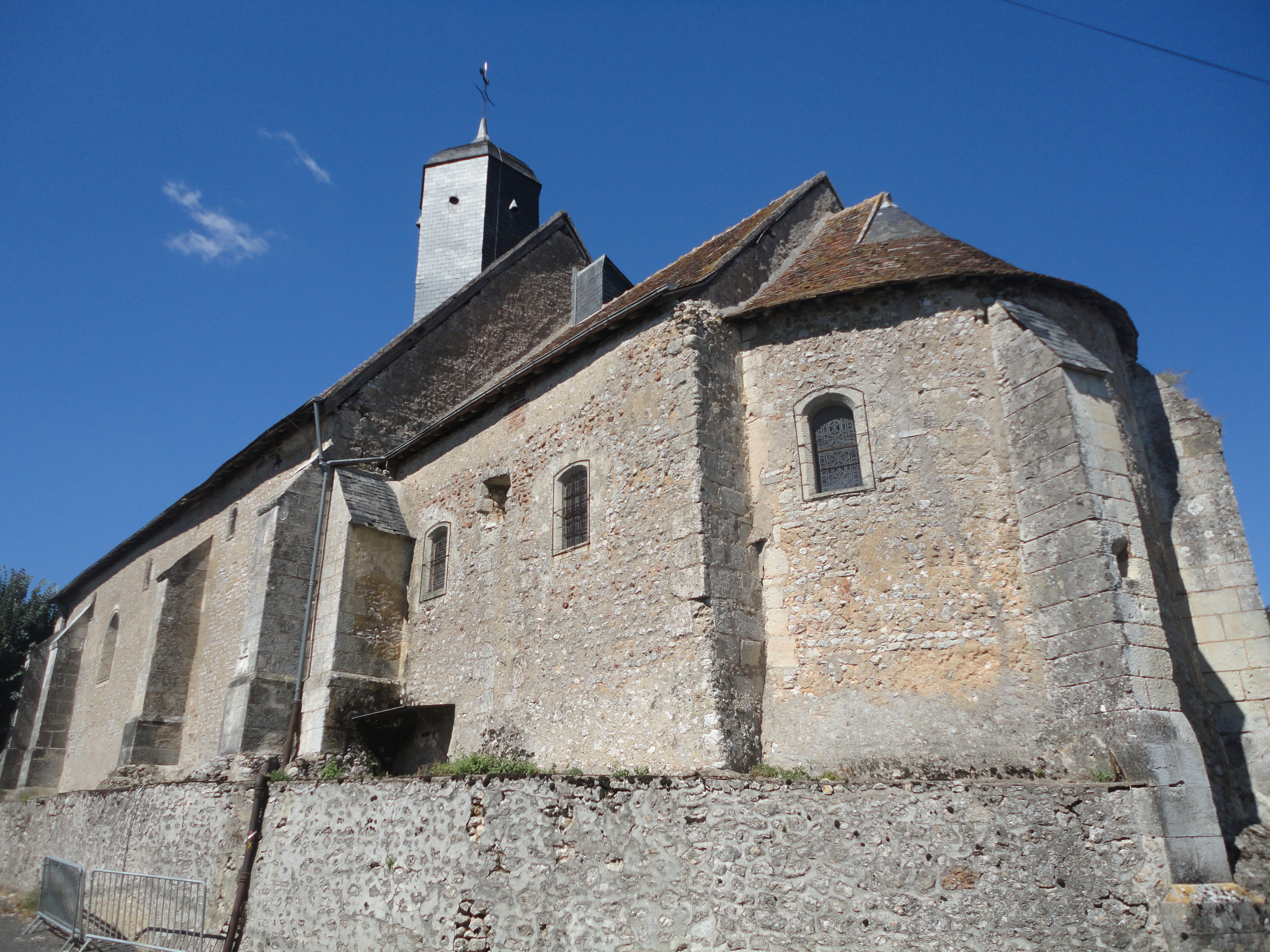
- The church in Neuillé-le-Lierre

- Coat of arms
- Location of Neuillé-le-Lierre
- Location within France Location within Centre-Val de Loire
- Coordinates: 47°31′00″N 0°55′00″E
- Country: France
- Region: Centre-Val de Loire
- Department: Indre-et-Loire
- Arrondissement: Loches
- Canton: Amboise

Government
  - Mayor (2020–2026): Blandine Benoist
- Area^{1}: 16.63 km^{2} (6.42 sq mi)
- Highest elevation: 122 m (400 ft)
- Lowest elevation: 65 m (213 ft)
- Population (2023): 753
  - Density: 45.3/km^{2} (117/sq mi)
- Time zone: UTC+01:00 (CET)
  - Summer (DST): UTC+02:00 (CEST)
- INSEE/Postal code: 37166 /37380
- ^{1} French Land Register data, which excludes lakes, ponds, glaciers > 1 km^{2} (0.386 sq mi or 247 acres) and river estuaries.

Neuillé-le-Lierre (French pronunciation: [nœje lə ljɛʁ]) is a commune located in the Indre-et-Loire department in central France.

== Population ==
Historical population
Year	Pop.	±% p.a.
1968	417	—
1975	372	−1.62%
1982	404	+1.19%
1990	514	+3.06%
1999	582	+1.39%
2007	711	+2.53%
2012	809	+2.62%
2017	794	−0.37%
2023	753	−0.88%
Source: INSEE

== See also ==
- Communes of the Indre-et-Loire department
