= Lussault-sur-Loire =

- Commune
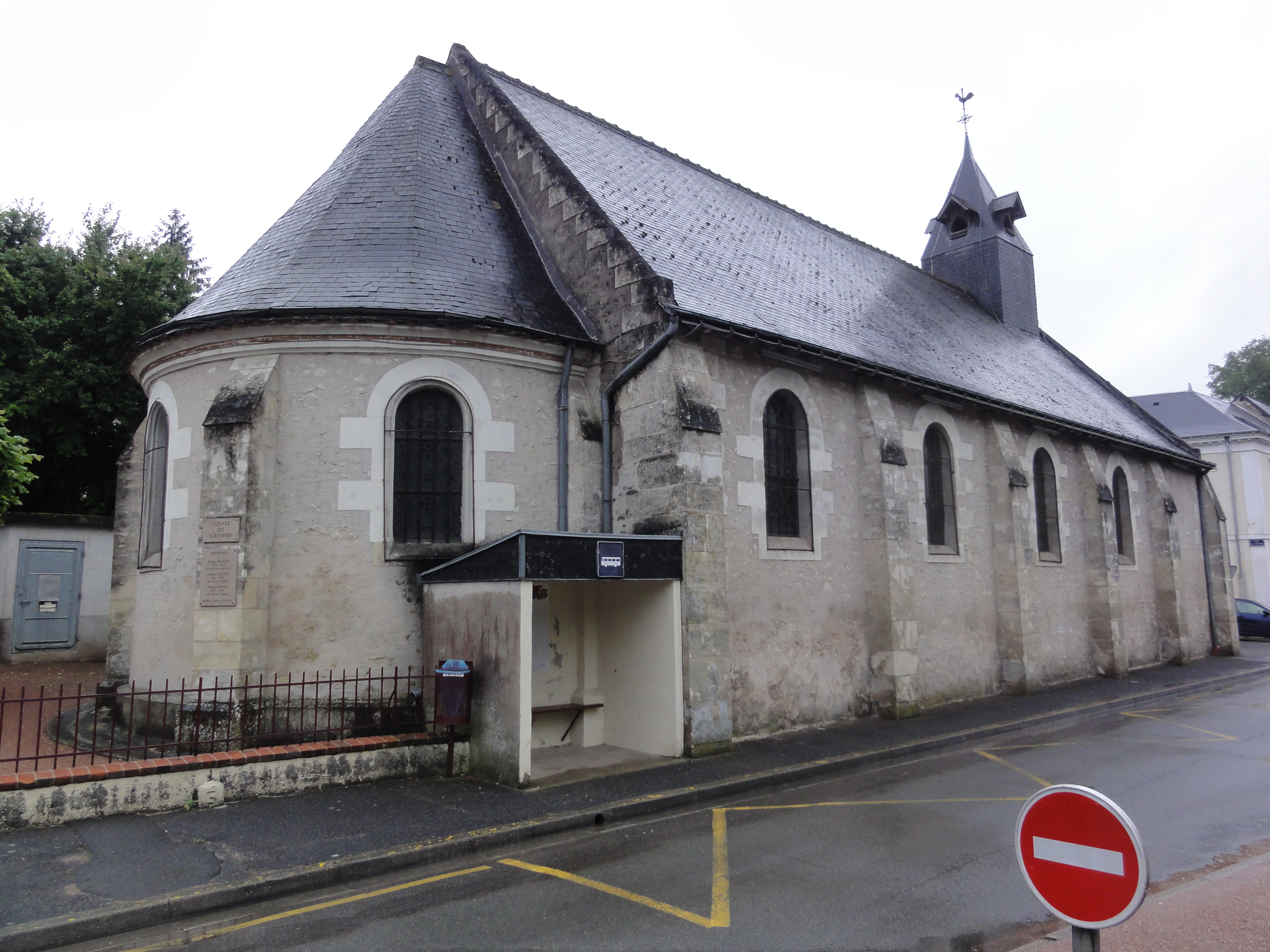
- The church of Saint-Etienne, in Lussault-sur-Loire

- Coat of arms
- Location of Lussault-sur-Loire
- Location within France Location within Centre-Val de Loire
- Coordinates: 47°23′51″N 0°55′08″E
- Country: France
- Region: Centre-Val de Loire
- Department: Indre-et-Loire
- Arrondissement: Loches
- Canton: Amboise

Government
  - Mayor (2020–2026): Hervé Lenglet
- Area^{1}: 9.36 km^{2} (3.61 sq mi)
- Highest elevation: 109 m (358 ft)
- Lowest elevation: 51 m (167 ft)
- Population (2023): 886
  - Density: 94.7/km^{2} (245/sq mi)
- Time zone: UTC+01:00 (CET)
  - Summer (DST): UTC+02:00 (CEST)
- INSEE/Postal code: 37138 /37400
- ^{1} French Land Register data, which excludes lakes, ponds, glaciers > 1 km^{2} (0.386 sq mi or 247 acres) and river estuaries.

Lussault-sur-Loire (French pronunciation: [lyso syʁ lwaʁ], literally Lussault on Loire) is a commune in the Indre-et-Loire department in central France.

== Population ==
Historical population
Year	Pop.	±% p.a.
1968	386	—
1975	464	+2.66%
1982	575	+3.11%
1990	665	+1.83%
1999	693	+0.46%
2007	708	+0.27%
2012	722	+0.39%
2017	789	+1.79%
2023	886	+1.95%
Source: INSEE

== See also ==
- Communes of the Indre-et-Loire department
