= Canton of Amboise =

French canton

Coordinates: 47.41°N 0.98°E

The canton of Amboise is an administrative division of the Indre-et-Loire department, central France. Its borders were modified at the French canton reorganisation which came into effect in March 2015. Its seat is in Amboise.

It consists of the following communes:

1. Amboise
2. Cangey
3. Chargé
4. Limeray
5. Lussault-sur-Loire
6. Montreuil-en-Touraine
7. Mosnes
8. Nazelles-Négron
9. Neuillé-le-Lierre
10. Noizay
11. Pocé-sur-Cisse
12. Saint-Ouen-les-Vignes
13. Saint-Règle
14. Souvigny-de-Touraine
