= Souvigny-de-Touraine =

- Commune
- Location of Souvigny-de-Touraine
- Location within France Location within Centre-Val de Loire
- Coordinates: 47°24′44″N 1°05′25″E
- Country: France
- Region: Centre-Val de Loire
- Department: Indre-et-Loire
- Arrondissement: Loches
- Canton: Amboise

Government
  - Mayor (2020–2026): Frédéric Sarouille
- Area^{1}: 26.18 km^{2} (10.11 sq mi)
- Highest elevation: 133 m (436 ft)
- Lowest elevation: 72 m (236 ft)
- Population (2023): 380
  - Density: 15/km^{2} (38/sq mi)
- Time zone: UTC+01:00 (CET)
  - Summer (DST): UTC+02:00 (CEST)
- INSEE/Postal code: 37252 /37530
- ^{1} French Land Register data, which excludes lakes, ponds, glaciers > 1 km^{2} (0.386 sq mi or 247 acres) and river estuaries.

Souvigny-de-Touraine (French pronunciation: [suviɲi də tuʁɛn], literally Souvigny of Touraine) is a commune in the Indre-et-Loire department in central France.

== Population ==
Historical population
Year	Pop.	±% p.a.
1968	274	—
1975	260	−0.75%
1982	275	+0.80%
1990	310	+1.51%
1999	366	+1.86%
2007	368	+0.07%
2012	372	+0.22%
2017	391	+1.00%
2023	380	−0.47%
Source: INSEE

== See also ==
- Communes of the Indre-et-Loire department
