= Pocé-sur-Cisse =

- Commune
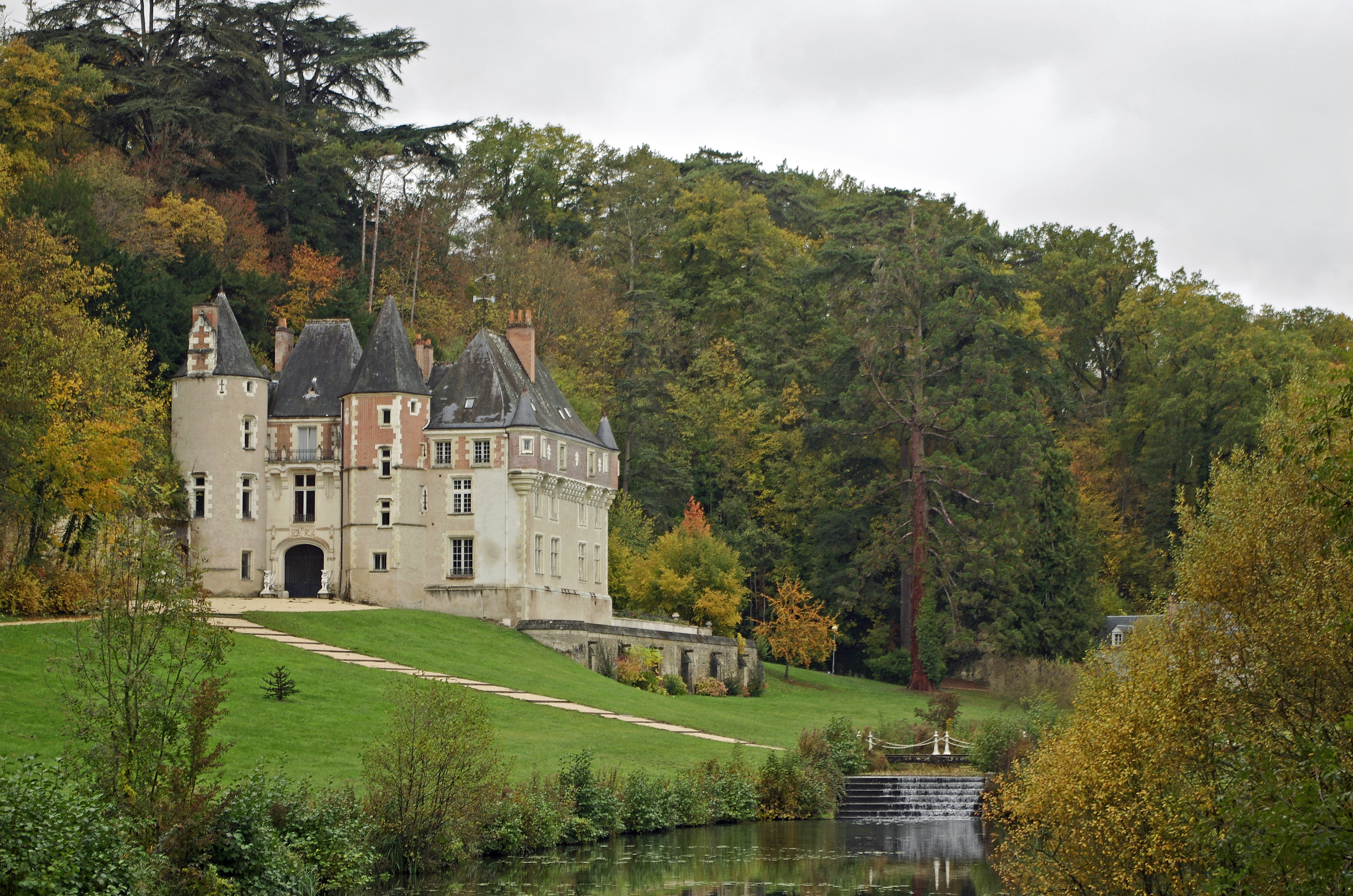
- Château de Pocé-sur-Cisse

- Coat of arms
- Location of Pocé-sur-Cisse
- Location within France Location within Centre-Val de Loire
- Coordinates: 47°26′43″N 0°59′30″E
- Country: France
- Region: Centre-Val de Loire
- Department: Indre-et-Loire
- Arrondissement: Loches
- Canton: Amboise
- Intercommunality: CC du Val d'Amboise

Government
  - Mayor (2026–32): Christel Mouneyrat
- Area^{1}: 10.61 km^{2} (4.10 sq mi)
- Highest elevation: 114 m (374 ft)
- Lowest elevation: 52 m (171 ft)
- Population (2023): 1,711
  - Density: 161.3/km^{2} (417.7/sq mi)
- Demonym: Pocéens
- Time zone: UTC+01:00 (CET)
  - Summer (DST): UTC+02:00 (CEST)
- INSEE/Postal code: 37185 /37530
- Website: poce-sur-cisse.fr
- ^{1} French Land Register data, which excludes lakes, ponds, glaciers > 1 km^{2} (0.386 sq mi or 247 acres) and river estuaries.

Pocé-sur-Cisse (French pronunciation: [pɔse syʁ sis]; lit. 'Pocé-on-Cisse') is a commune in the Indre-et-Loire department in central France. English singer Mick Jagger owns a secondary residence in the commune, formerly of Étienne François de Choiseul, Duke of Choiseul.

== Population ==
Historical population
| Year | Pop. | ±% p.a. |
|---|---|---|
| 1968 | 1,070 | — |
| 1975 | 1,153 | +1.07% |
| 1982 | 1,222 | +0.83% |
| 1990 | 1,493 | +2.54% |
| 1999 | 1,580 | +0.63% |
| 2007 | 1,559 | −0.17% |
| 2012 | 1,627 | +0.86% |
| 2017 | 1,639 | +0.15% |
| 2023 | 1,711 | +0.72% |
Source: INSEE

== See also ==
- Communes of the Indre-et-Loire department
