= Nazelles-Négron =

- Commune
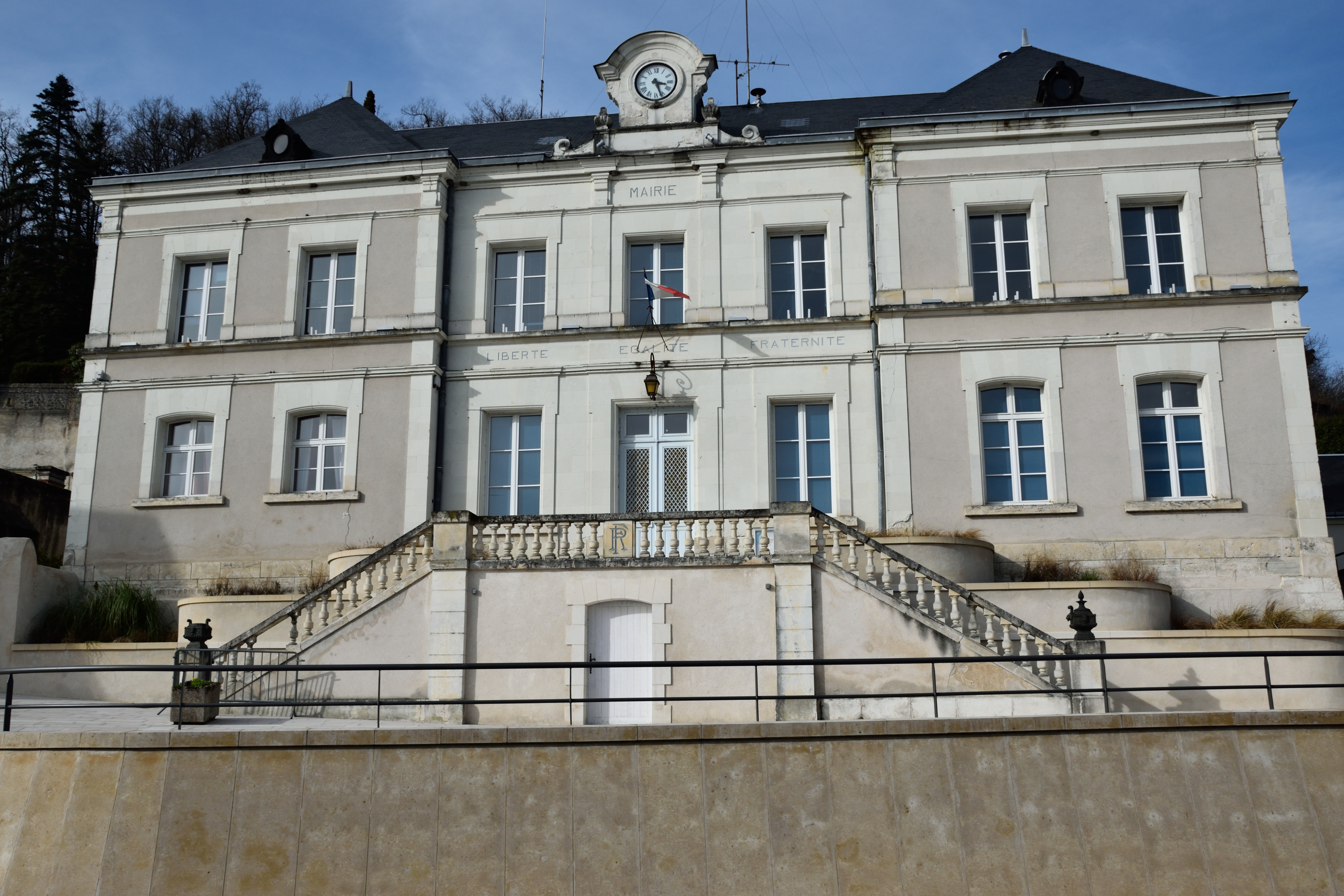
- Town hall

- Coat of arms
- Location of Nazelles-Négron
- Location within France Location within Centre-Val de Loire
- Coordinates: 47°25′58″N 0°57′15″E
- Country: France
- Region: Centre-Val de Loire
- Department: Indre-et-Loire
- Arrondissement: Loches
- Canton: Amboise

Government
  - Mayor (2022–2026): Cyrille Martin
- Area^{1}: 22.32 km^{2} (8.62 sq mi)
- Highest elevation: 114 m (374 ft)
- Lowest elevation: 51 m (167 ft)
- Population (2023): 3,776
  - Density: 169.2/km^{2} (438.2/sq mi)
- Time zone: UTC+01:00 (CET)
  - Summer (DST): UTC+02:00 (CEST)
- INSEE/Postal code: 37163 /37530
- ^{1} French Land Register data, which excludes lakes, ponds, glaciers > 1 km^{2} (0.386 sq mi or 247 acres) and river estuaries.

Nazelles-Négron (French pronunciation: [nazɛl neɡʁɔ̃]) is a commune in the Indre-et-Loire department in central France.

== Population ==
The commune was formed in 1971 by the merger of Nazelles and Négron. Population data before 1971 refer to the former commune of Nazelles.

Historical population

Year	Pop.	±% p.a.
1793	899	—
1800	959	+0.93%
1806	960	+0.02%
1821	995	+0.24%
1831	1,107	+1.07%
1836	1,116	+0.16%
1841	1,103	−0.23%
1846	1,073	−0.55%
1851	1,093	+0.37%
1856	1,146	+0.95%
1861	1,209	+1.08%
1866	1,234	+0.41%
1872	1,153	−1.13%
1876	1,129	−0.52%
1881	1,195	+1.14%
1886	1,245	+0.82%
1891	1,227	−0.29%
1896	1,235	+0.13%
1901	1,211	−0.39%

Year	Pop.	±% p.a.
1906	1,283	+1.16%
1911	1,301	+0.28%
1921	1,290	−0.08%
1926	1,318	+0.43%
1931	1,402	+1.24%
1936	1,368	−0.49%
1946	1,375	+0.05%
1954	1,509	+1.17%
1962	1,743	+1.82%
1968	1,747	+0.04%
1975	2,920	+7.61%
1982	3,263	+1.60%
1990	3,547	+1.05%
1999	3,633	+0.27%
2007	3,587	−0.16%
2012	3,568	−0.11%
2017	3,532	−0.20%
2023	3,776	+1.12%

Source: EHESS and INSEE (1975-2023)

== See also ==
- Communes of the Indre-et-Loire department
