= Limeray =

- Commune
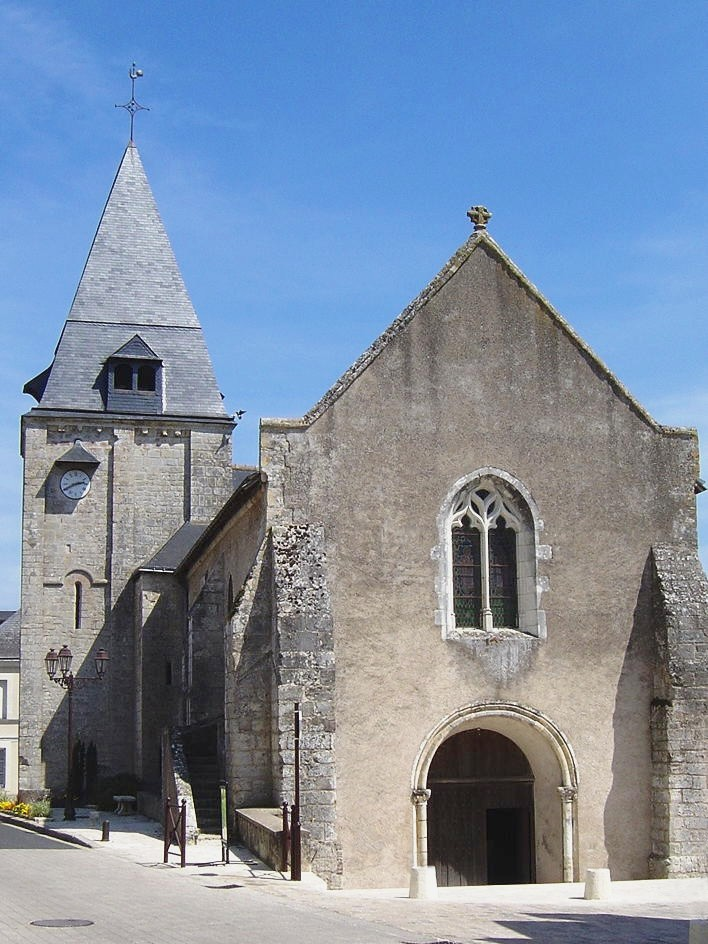
- The church in Limeray

- Coat of arms
- Location of Limeray
- Location within France Location within Centre-Val de Loire
- Coordinates: 47°27′37″N 1°02′33″E
- Country: France
- Region: Centre-Val de Loire
- Department: Indre-et-Loire
- Arrondissement: Loches
- Canton: Amboise

Government
  - Mayor (2021–2026): Virginie Gay-Chanteloup
- Area^{1}: 14.39 km^{2} (5.56 sq mi)
- Highest elevation: 116 m (381 ft)
- Lowest elevation: 52 m (171 ft)
- Population (2023): 1,252
  - Density: 87.00/km^{2} (225.3/sq mi)
- Time zone: UTC+01:00 (CET)
  - Summer (DST): UTC+02:00 (CEST)
- INSEE/Postal code: 37131 /37530
- ^{1} French Land Register data, which excludes lakes, ponds, glaciers > 1 km^{2} (0.386 sq mi or 247 acres) and river estuaries.

Limeray (French pronunciation: [limʁɛ]) is a commune in the Indre-et-Loire department in central France.

== Population ==
Historical population
Year	Pop.	±% p.a.
1968	896	—
1975	886	−0.16%
1982	910	+0.38%
1990	972	+0.83%
1999	945	−0.31%
2007	1,083	+1.72%
2012	1,229	+2.56%
2017	1,308	+1.25%
2023	1,252	−0.73%
Source: INSEE

== See also ==
- Communes of the Indre-et-Loire department
