= Saint-Règle =

- Commune
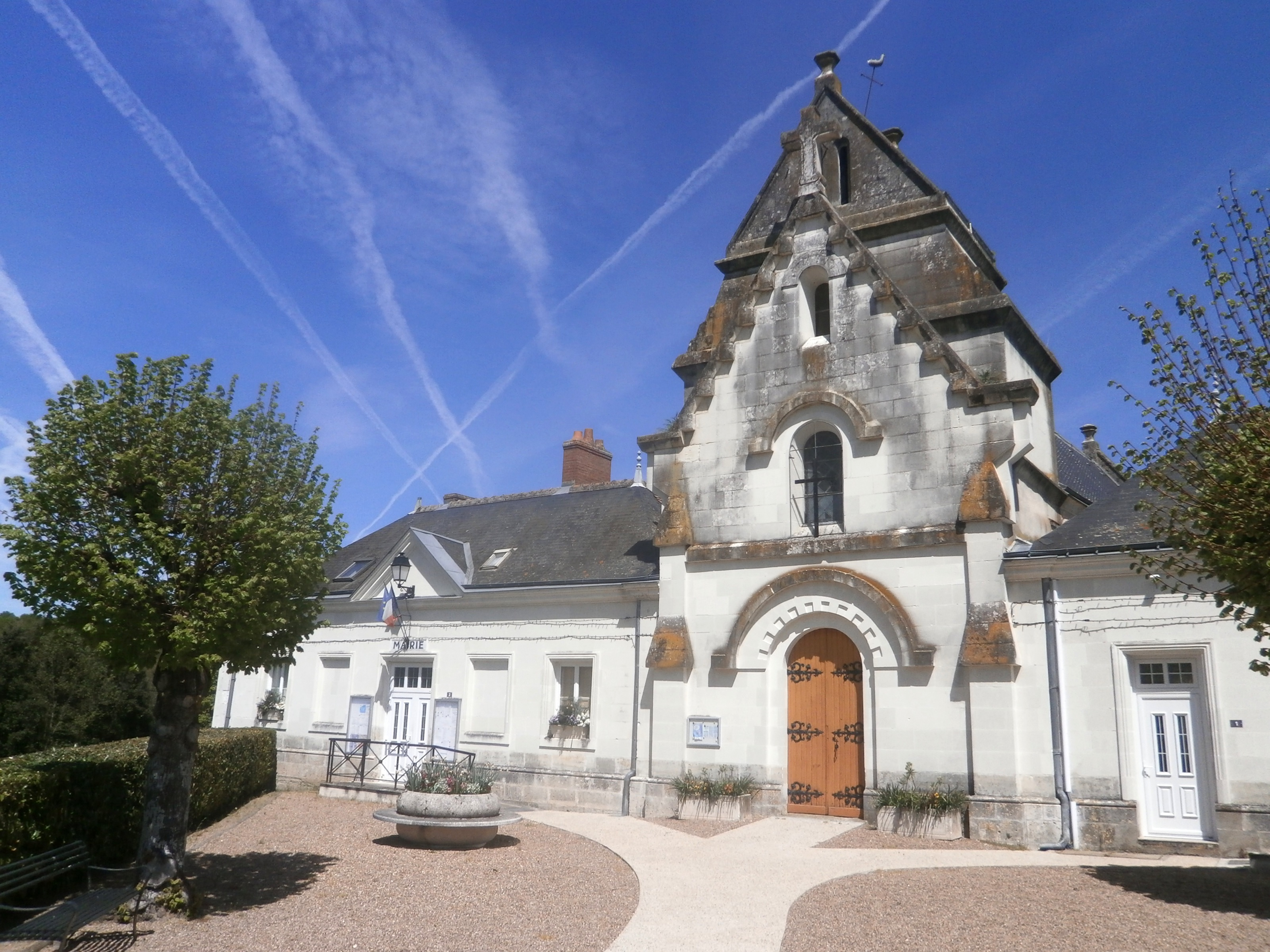
- Town hall
- Location of Saint-Règle
- Location within France Location within Centre-Val de Loire
- Coordinates: 47°24′33″N 1°03′15″E
- Country: France
- Region: Centre-Val de Loire
- Department: Indre-et-Loire
- Arrondissement: Loches
- Canton: Amboise
- Intercommunality: Val d'Amboise

Government
  - Mayor (2020–2026): Christine Fauquet
- Area^{1}: 6.49 km^{2} (2.51 sq mi)
- Highest elevation: 110 m (360 ft)
- Lowest elevation: 62 m (203 ft)
- Population (2023): 599
  - Density: 92.3/km^{2} (239/sq mi)
- Time zone: UTC+01:00 (CET)
  - Summer (DST): UTC+02:00 (CEST)
- INSEE/Postal code: 37236 /37530
- ^{1} French Land Register data, which excludes lakes, ponds, glaciers > 1 km^{2} (0.386 sq mi or 247 acres) and river estuaries.

Saint-Règle (French pronunciation: [sɛ̃ ʁɛɡl]) is a commune in the Indre-et-Loire department in central France.

== Population ==
Historical population
Year	Pop.	±% p.a.
1968	228	—
1975	189	−2.64%
1982	281	+5.83%
1990	330	+2.03%
1999	347	+0.56%
2007	381	+1.18%
2012	520	+6.42%
2017	609	+3.21%
2023	599	−0.28%
Source: INSEE

== See also ==
- Communes of the Indre-et-Loire department
