= Saint-Ouen-les-Vignes =

- Commune
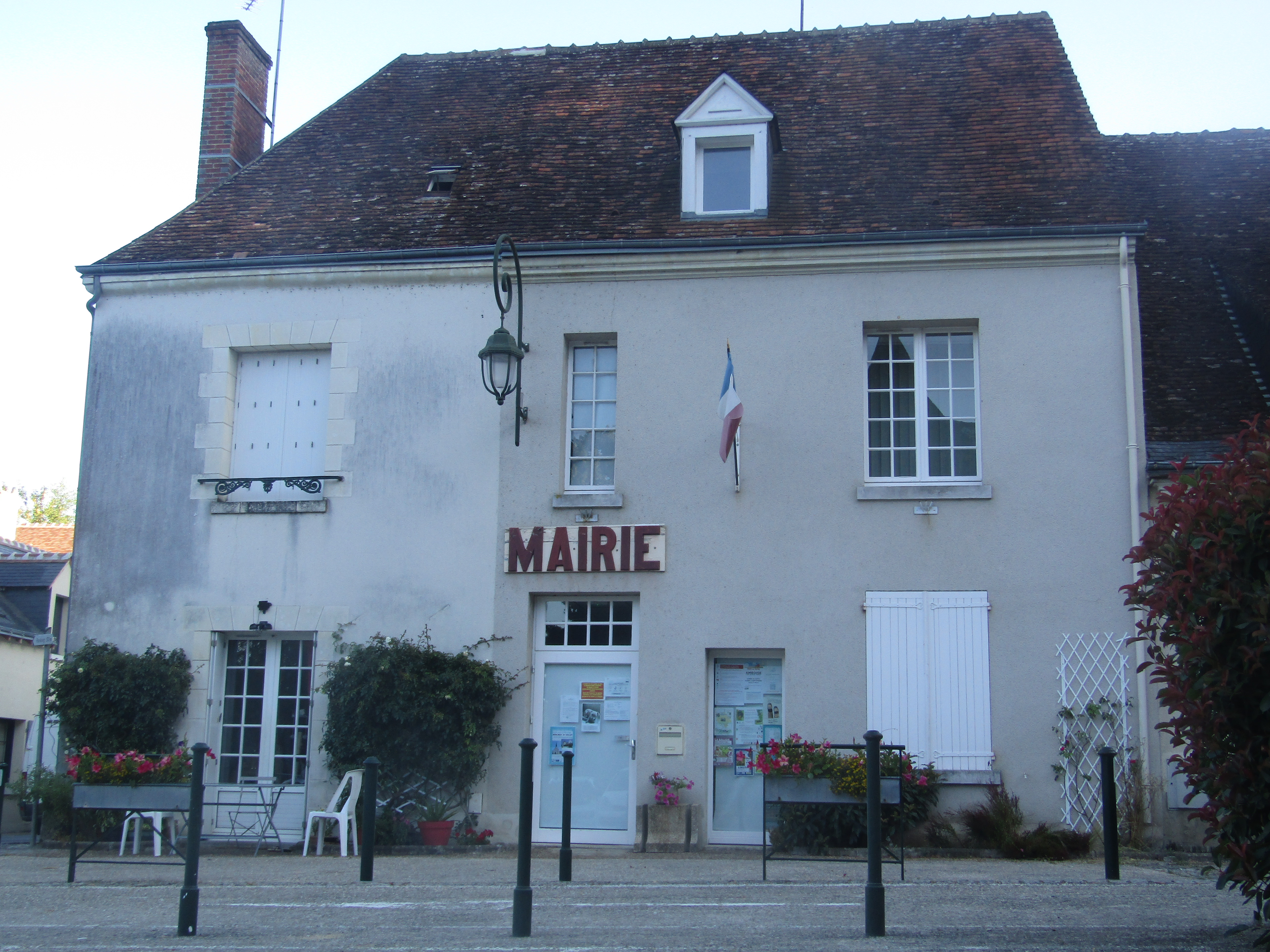
- Location of Saint-Ouen-les-Vignes
- Location within France Location within Centre-Val de Loire
- Coordinates: 47°28′14″N 0°59′43″E
- Country: France
- Region: Centre-Val de Loire
- Department: Indre-et-Loire
- Arrondissement: Loches
- Canton: Amboise

Government
  - Mayor (2020–2026): Philippe Deniau
- Area^{1}: 18.55 km^{2} (7.16 sq mi)
- Highest elevation: 116 m (381 ft)
- Lowest elevation: 63 m (207 ft)
- Population (2023): 963
  - Density: 51.9/km^{2} (134/sq mi)
- Time zone: UTC+01:00 (CET)
  - Summer (DST): UTC+02:00 (CEST)
- INSEE/Postal code: 37230 /37530
- ^{1} French Land Register data, which excludes lakes, ponds, glaciers > 1 km^{2} (0.386 sq mi or 247 acres) and river estuaries.

Saint-Ouen-les-Vignes (French pronunciation: [sɛ̃.t‿wɛ̃ le viɲ]) is a commune in the Indre-et-Loire department in central France.

== Population ==
Historical population
| Year | Pop. | ±% p.a. |
|---|---|---|
| 1968 | 496 | — |
| 1975 | 571 | +2.03% |
| 1982 | 727 | +3.51% |
| 1990 | 747 | +0.34% |
| 1999 | 941 | +2.60% |
| 2007 | 1,032 | +1.16% |
| 2012 | 1,022 | −0.19% |
| 2017 | 1,016 | −0.12% |
| 2023 | 963 | −0.89% |
Source: INSEE

== See also ==
- Communes of the Indre-et-Loire department
