= Montreuil-en-Touraine =

- Commune
- Coat of arms
- Location of Montreuil-en-Touraine
- Location within France Location within Centre-Val de Loire
- Coordinates: 47°29′16″N 0°56′52″E
- Country: France
- Region: Centre-Val de Loire
- Department: Indre-et-Loire
- Arrondissement: Loches
- Canton: Amboise

Government
  - Mayor (2020–2026): Claude Ciccuti
- Area^{1}: 25.09 km^{2} (9.69 sq mi)
- Highest elevation: 113 m (371 ft)
- Lowest elevation: 76 m (249 ft)
- Population (2023): 740
  - Density: 29/km^{2} (76/sq mi)
- Time zone: UTC+01:00 (CET)
  - Summer (DST): UTC+02:00 (CEST)
- INSEE/Postal code: 37158 /37530
- ^{1} French Land Register data, which excludes lakes, ponds, glaciers > 1 km^{2} (0.386 sq mi or 247 acres) and river estuaries.

Montreuil-en-Touraine (French pronunciation: [mɔ̃tʁœj‿ɑ̃ tuʁɛn], literally Montreuil in Touraine) is a commune in Indre-et-Loire department in central France.

== Population ==
Historical population
Year	Pop.	±% p.a.
1968	433	—
1975	343	−3.27%
1982	521	+6.15%
1990	632	+2.44%
1999	642	+0.17%
2007	692	+0.94%
2012	772	+2.21%
2017	832	+1.51%
2023	740	−1.93%
Source: INSEE

== See also ==
- Communes of the Indre-et-Loire department
