= Cangey =

- Commune
- Location of Cangey
- Location within France Location within Centre-Val de Loire
- Coordinates: 47°28′07″N 1°03′41″E
- Country: France
- Region: Centre-Val de Loire
- Department: Indre-et-Loire
- Arrondissement: Loches
- Canton: Amboise

Government
  - Mayor (2020–2026): Yves Rosse
- Area^{1}: 22.98 km^{2} (8.87 sq mi)
- Highest elevation: 114 m (374 ft)
- Lowest elevation: 56 m (184 ft)
- Population (2023): 1,021
  - Density: 44.43/km^{2} (115.1/sq mi)
- Time zone: UTC+01:00 (CET)
  - Summer (DST): UTC+02:00 (CEST)
- INSEE/Postal code: 37043 /37530
- ^{1} French Land Register data, which excludes lakes, ponds, glaciers > 1 km^{2} (0.386 sq mi or 247 acres) and river estuaries.

Cangey (French pronunciation: [kɑ̃ʒɛ]) is a commune in the Indre-et-Loire department in central France.

== Population ==
Historical population
Year	Pop.	±% p.a.
1968	631	—
1975	542	−2.15%
1982	631	+2.20%
1990	722	+1.70%
1999	773	+0.76%
2007	1,038	+3.75%
2012	1,084	+0.87%
2017	1,062	−0.41%
2023	1,021	−0.65%
Source: INSEE

== See also ==
- Communes of the Indre-et-Loire department
