= Communauté de communes de la Touraine du Sud =

Touraine du Sud
- Former communauté de communes
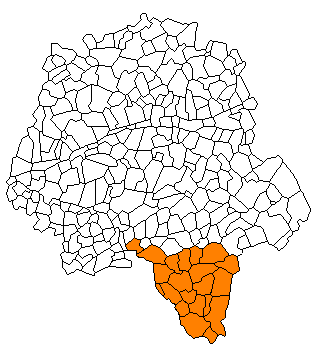
- Location within the department
- Country: France
- Region: Centre-Val de Loire
- Department: Indre-et-Loire
- No. of communes: {{{nbcomm}}}
- Established: 14 December 2000
- Disbanded: 31 December 2016
- Area: 639.39 km^{2} (246.87 sq mi)
- Population (2013): 15,652
  - Density: 24.480/km^{2} (63.402/sq mi)

The Communauté de communes de la Touraine du Sud is a former federation of municipalities (communauté de communes) in the Indre-et-Loire département and in the Centre-Val de Loire région of France. It was created in December 2000. It was merged into the new Communauté de communes Loches Sud Touraine in January 2017. Its seat was in Preuilly-sur-Claise, but Descartes was the most populous commune of the communauté de communes.

== Composition ==
The Communauté de communes de la Touraine du Sud comprised 21 communes:

- Abilly
- Barrou
- Betz-le-Château
- Bossay-sur-Claise
- Boussay
- La Celle-Guenand
- La Celle-Saint-Avant
- Chambon
- Charnizay
- Chaumussay
- Descartes
- Ferrière-Larçon
- Le Grand-Pressigny
- La Guerche
- Neuilly-le-Brignon
- Paulmy
- Le Petit-Pressigny
- Preuilly-sur-Claise
- Saint-Flovier
- Tournon-Saint-Pierre
- Yzeures-sur-Creuse

== Demography ==
Historical population
Year	Pop.	±% p.a.
1968	20,456	—
1975	19,258	−0.86%
1982	18,124	−0.86%
1990	17,200	−0.65%
1999	16,240	−0.64%
2006	15,704	−0.48%
2009	15,567	−0.29%

== Politics and government ==
=== Intercommunal representation ===
List of presidents of the Communauté de communes de la Touraine du Sud
In office		Name	Party	Capacity	Ref.
2000	2008	Yves Maveyraud	PS	Mayor of Preuilly-sur-Claise, General councillor	
2008	2016	Gérard Hénault	LC	Mayor of Ferrière-Larçon, General councillor	

== See also ==
- Communes of the Indre-et-Loire department
- Commune communities in France
