= Descartes, Indre-et-Loire =

Descartes
- Commune
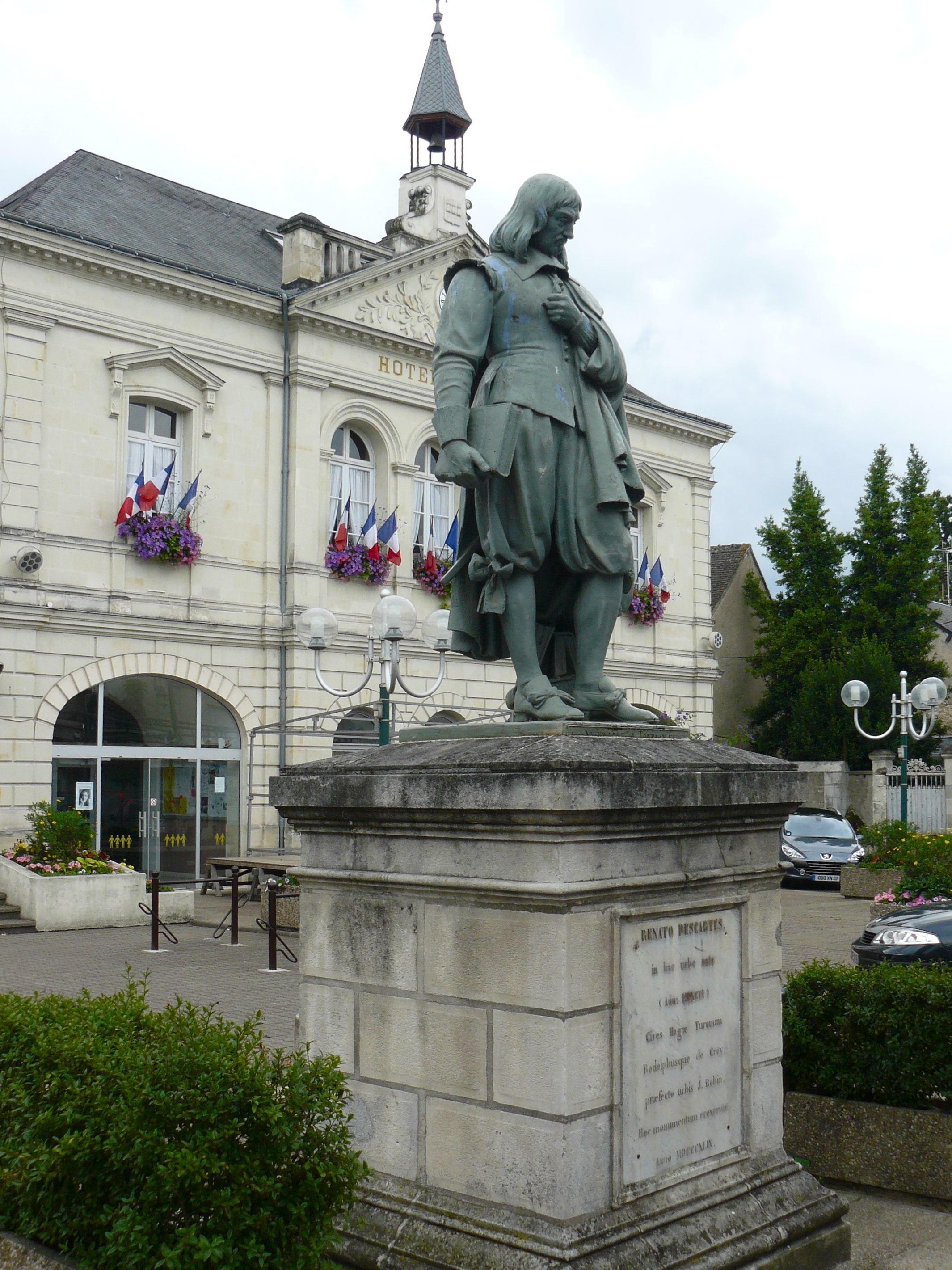
- Town hall and Descartes statue

- Coat of arms
- Location of Descartes
- Location within France Location within Centre-Val de Loire
- Coordinates: 46°58′28″N 0°41′55″E
- Country: France
- Region: Centre-Val de Loire
- Department: Indre-et-Loire
- Arrondissement: Loches
- Canton: Descartes
- Intercommunality: CC Loches Sud Touraine

Government
  - Mayor (2020–2026): Bruno Méreau
- Area^{1}: 38.08 km^{2} (14.70 sq mi)
- Highest elevation: 121 m (397 ft)
- Lowest elevation: 37 m (121 ft)
- Population (2023): 3,369
  - Density: 88.47/km^{2} (229.1/sq mi)
- Demonym: Descartois
- Time zone: UTC+01:00 (CET)
  - Summer (DST): UTC+02:00 (CEST)
- INSEE/Postal code: 37115 /37160
- ^{1} French Land Register data, which excludes lakes, ponds, glaciers > 1 km^{2} (0.386 sq mi or 247 acres) and river estuaries.

Descartes (French pronunciation: [dekaʁt]) is a large village and commune in the Indre-et-Loire department in central France. It is approximately 29 kilometres east of Richelieu and about 48 kilometres east of Loudun, on the banks of the river Creuse, on the border with the Vienne department, which is also the regional border between Centre-Val de Loire and Nouvelle-Aquitaine.

It is famous as the birthplace of the French mathematician and philosopher who invented the Cartesian coordinate system, René Descartes.

== History ==
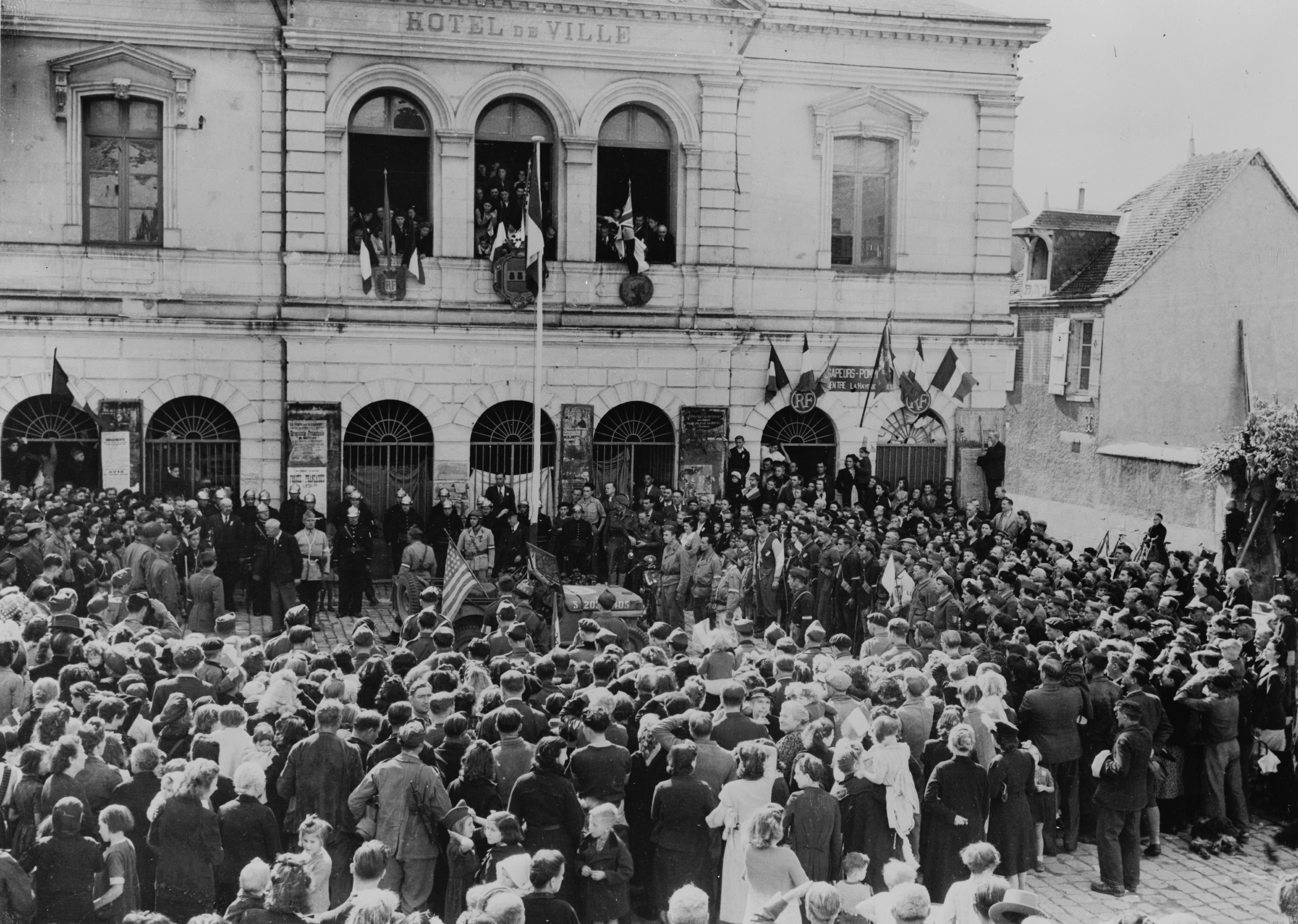
Liberation of Descartes (then La Haye-Descartes) in 1944

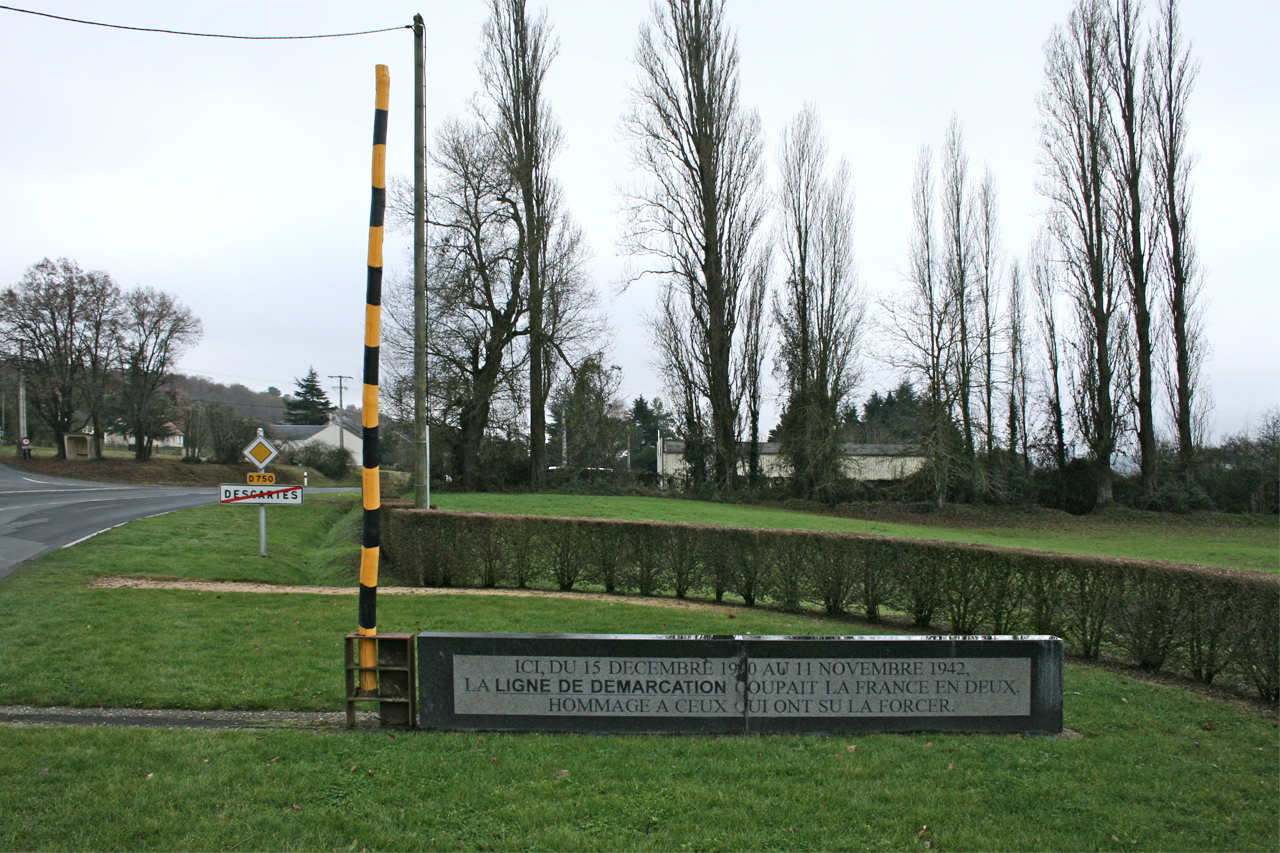
Former demarcation zone

Initially called La Haye-en-Touraine, the town was the birthplace of the philosopher René Descartes (1596–1650), who invented the Cartesian coordinate system, although his family home was in nearby Châtellerault. Descartes left La Haye in approximately 1606 to attend the College Henri IV at La Flèche. During World War II, the liberation of Descartes happened in 1944. The demarcation line was used as a border of Vichy France from 1940 to 1942. The town was renamed La Haye-Descartes in 1802 in his honour, and then renamed again Descartes in 1967.

In 1966, the commune of Balesmes was merged with the commune of Descartes, as the commune's population was increased to 4,627 in 1968, rather than its smaller population in 1962 (about 1,679 people).

== Geography ==
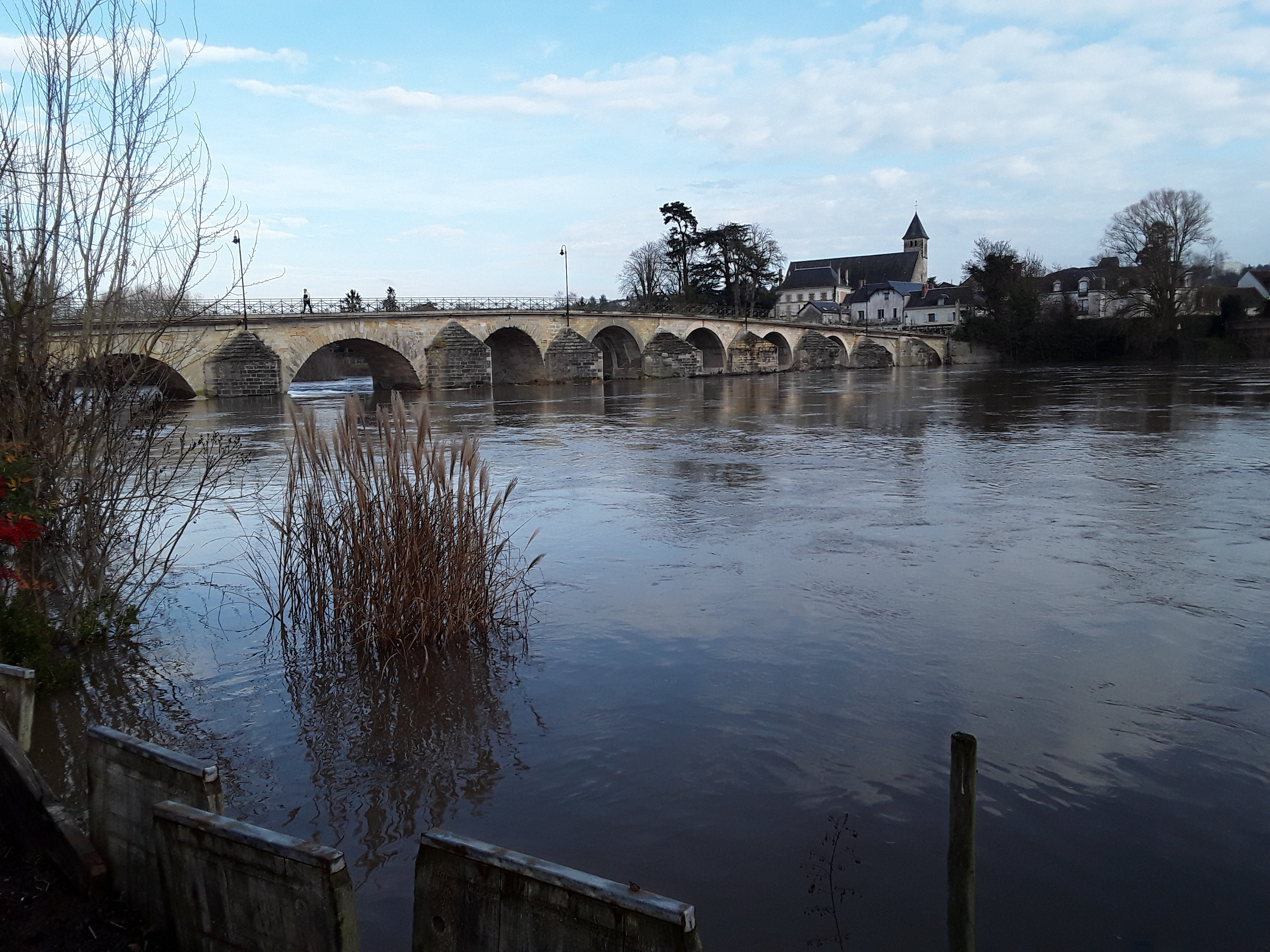
The Creuse in Descartes

The river Creuse forms a border between the department of Vienne, as well the region of Centre-Val de Loire and Nouvelle-Aquitaine. The town is situated approximately 300 kilometers south of Paris, the country's capital, and about fifty kilometers south of Tours, the prefecture of the department.

The commune is bordered by nine other communes, six in Indre-et-Loire, and three in Vienne: Marcé-sur-Esves to the north, La Celle-Saint-Avant to the northwest, Civray-sur-Esves to the northeast, Cussay to the east, Neuilly-le-Brignon to the southeast, Abilly to the south, and the department of Vienne to the east across the Creuse by the communes of Buxeuil to the southwest, and finally by Les Ormes and Port-de-Piles to the east.

== Education ==
The kindergartens, schools and universities in Descartes are:

- L'école maternelle Côte des Granges
- L'école élémentaire Côte des Granges
- L'école primaire Balesmes
- L'école primaire privée Louis Lefé
- Le collège Roger Jahan

== Population ==
Historical population

Year	Pop.	±% p.a.
1793	997	—
1800	850	−2.25%
1806	943	+1.75%
1821	1,123	+1.17%
1831	1,293	+1.42%
1836	1,393	+1.50%
1841	1,459	+0.93%
1846	1,592	+1.76%
1851	1,633	+0.51%
1856	1,532	−1.27%
1861	1,620	+1.12%
1866	1,609	−0.14%
1872	1,722	+1.14%
1876	1,735	+0.19%
1881	1,608	−1.51%
1886	1,694	+1.05%
1891	1,806	+1.29%
1896	1,786	−0.22%
1901	1,622	−1.91%

Year	Pop.	±% p.a.
1906	1,638	+0.20%
1911	1,697	+0.71%
1921	1,702	+0.03%
1926	1,670	−0.38%
1931	1,570	−1.23%
1936	1,537	−0.42%
1946	1,477	−0.40%
1954	1,466	−0.09%
1962	1,679	+1.71%
1968	4,267	+16.82%
1975	4,446	+0.59%
1982	4,357	−0.29%
1990	4,120	−0.70%
1999	4,019	−0.28%
2007	3,841	−0.56%
2012	3,754	−0.46%
2017	3,489	−1.45%
2023	3,369	−0.58%

Source: EHESS and INSEE (1968-2023)

== Etymology ==
The town was originally called as Haiam in Latin (refers to a wood or a field that is surrounded by fences) in 1155, then La Haye, and then La Haye-en-Touraine.

It was renamed to La Haye-Descartes during the French Revolution, the name of a revolutionary that is survived until the middle 20th century.

The commune of Balesmes was merged with the commune of Descartes in 1966. The new commune was formed and was named Descartes in 1967, in honour of the philosopher René Descartes, who was born in the village in 1596.

The town is locally nicknamed as the "town of the three Renés" (René Descartes, René de Buxeuil, and René Boylesve).

== Personalities ==
The town is notable in Acadian genealogy as the birthplace of the Heberts and the famous mathematician René Descartes, who invented the Cartesian coordinate system. To honour him, there is a statue near the town hall. It was also the birthplace of landscape painter, Pierre Ballue, as well as René Boylesve, writer and literary critic, the electrical engineer Gustave Trouvé, and the composer René de Buxeuil.

== International relationships ==
Descartes is twinned with four other cities in three countries:

- Cheddar, United Kingdom (1952)
- Aurora do Tocantins, Brazil (1973)
- La Albuera, Spain (1996)
- Pueblonuevo del Guadiana, Spain (2013)

Descartes also has cooperation with Lhatse in Tibet and Villadiego in Spain.

== See also ==
- List of places named after people
- Communes of the Indre-et-Loire department
