= Canton of Preuilly-sur-Claise =

Coordinates: 46.8556°N 0.929444°E

Preuilly-sur-Claise
- Former canton
- Interactive map of Preuilly-sur-Claise
- Country: France
- Region: Centre-Val de Loire
- Department: Indre-et-Loire
- No. of communes: {{{nbcomm}}}
- Disbanded: 2015
- Area: 304.89 km^{2} (117.72 sq mi)
- Population (2012): 5,077
  - Density: 16.65/km^{2} (43.13/sq mi)

The Canton of Preuilly-sur-Claise is a former canton situated in the Indre-et-Loire département and in the Centre region of France. It was disbanded following the French canton reorganisation which came into effect in March 2015. It consisted of 8 communes, which joined the canton of Descartes in 2015. It had 5,077 inhabitants (2012).

The canton comprised the following communes:

- Bossay-sur-Claise
- Boussay
- Chambon
- Charnizay
- Chaumussay
- Preuilly-sur-Claise
- Tournon-Saint-Pierre
- Yzeures-sur-Creuse

== Population ==
Historical population
Year	Pop.	±%
1962	7,143	—
1968	7,104	−0.5%
1975	6,720	−5.4%
1982	6,358	−5.4%
1990	6,035	−5.1%
1999	5,411	−10.3%
2006	5,211	−3.7%
2012	5,077	−2.6%

== See also ==
- Arrondissements of the Indre-et-Loire department
- Cantons of the Indre-et-Loire department
- Communes of the Indre-et-Loire department
