= Arrondissement of Loches =

Coordinates: 47.13°N 1.00°E

Loches
- Arrondissement
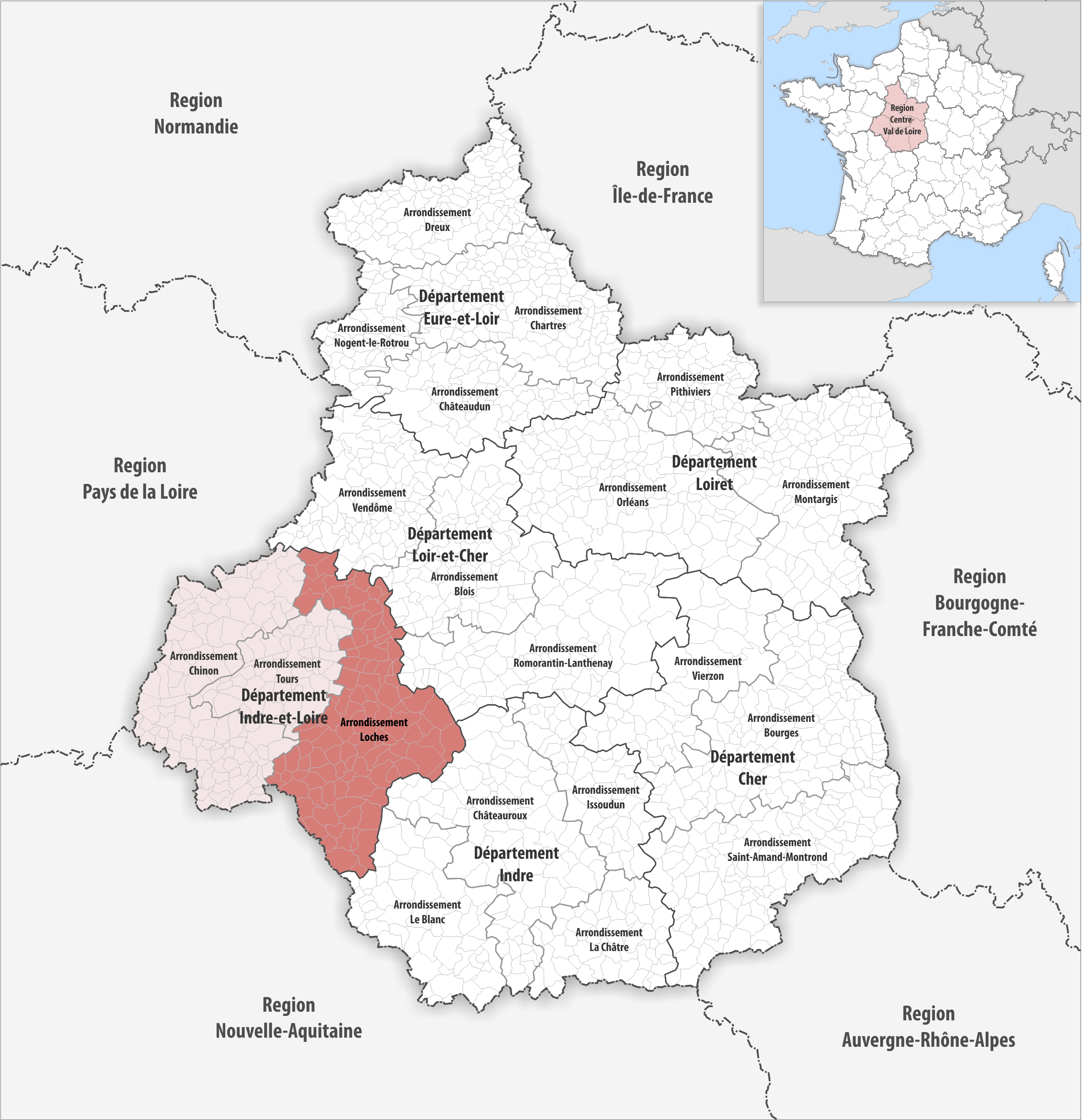
- Location within the region Centre-Val de Loire
- Country: France
- Region: Centre-Val de Loire
- Department: Indre-et-Loire
- No. of communes: {{{nbcomm}}}
- Area: 2,742.5 km^{2} (1,058.9 sq mi)
- Population (2023): 117,100
  - Density: 42.70/km^{2} (110.6/sq mi)
- INSEE code: 373

The arrondissement of Loches is an arrondissement of France in the Indre-et-Loire department in the Centre-Val de Loire region. It has 112 communes. Its population is 116,590 (2021), and its area is 2,742.5 km^{2} (1,058.9 sq mi).

== Composition ==
The communes of the arrondissement of Loches, and their INSEE codes, are:

1. Abilly (37001)
2. Amboise (37003)
3. Athée-sur-Cher (37008)
4. Autrèche (37009)
5. Auzouer-en-Touraine (37010)
6. Azay-sur-Indre (37016)
7. Barrou (37019)
8. Beaulieu-lès-Loches (37020)
9. Beaumont-Village (37023)
10. Betz-le-Château (37026)
11. Bléré (37027)
12. Bossay-sur-Claise (37028)
13. Bossée (37029)
14. Le Boulay (37030)
15. Bournan (37032)
16. Boussay (37033)
17. Bridoré (37039)
18. Cangey (37043)
19. La Celle-Guenand (37044)
20. La Celle-Saint-Avant (37045)
21. Céré-la-Ronde (37046)
22. Chambon (37048)
23. Chambourg-sur-Indre (37049)
24. Chanceaux-près-Loches (37053)
25. La Chapelle-Blanche-Saint-Martin (37057)
26. Chargé (37060)
27. Charnizay (37061)
28. Château-Renault (37063)
29. Chaumussay (37064)
30. Chédigny (37066)
31. Chemillé-sur-Indrois (37069)
32. Chenonceaux (37070)
33. Chisseaux (37073)
34. Cigogné (37075)
35. Ciran (37078)
36. Civray-de-Touraine (37079)
37. Civray-sur-Esves (37080)
38. Cormery (37083)
39. Courçay (37085)
40. La Croix-en-Touraine (37091)
41. Crotelles (37092)
42. Cussay (37094)
43. Dame-Marie-les-Bois (37095)
44. Descartes (37115)
45. Dierre (37096)
46. Dolus-le-Sec (37097)
47. Draché (37098)
48. Épeigné-les-Bois (37100)
49. Esves-le-Moutier (37103)
50. La Ferrière (37106)
51. Ferrière-Larçon (37107)
52. Ferrière-sur-Beaulieu (37108)
53. Francueil (37110)
54. Genillé (37111)
55. Le Grand-Pressigny (37113)
56. La Guerche (37114)
57. Les Hermites (37116)
58. Le Liège (37127)
59. Ligueil (37130)
60. Limeray (37131)
61. Loches (37132)
62. Loché-sur-Indrois (37133)
63. Louans (37134)
64. Le Louroux (37136)
65. Lussault-sur-Loire (37138)
66. Luzillé (37141)
67. Manthelan (37143)
68. Marcé-sur-Esves (37145)
69. Monthodon (37155)
70. Montrésor (37157)
71. Montreuil-en-Touraine (37158)
72. Morand (37160)
73. Mosnes (37161)
74. Mouzay (37162)
75. Nazelles-Négron (37163)
76. Neuillé-le-Lierre (37166)
77. Neuilly-le-Brignon (37168)
78. Neuville-sur-Brenne (37169)
79. Noizay (37171)
80. Nouans-les-Fontaines (37173)
81. Nouzilly (37175)
82. Orbigny (37177)
83. Paulmy (37181)
84. Perrusson (37183)
85. Le Petit-Pressigny (37184)
86. Pocé-sur-Cisse (37185)
87. Preuilly-sur-Claise (37189)
88. Reignac-sur-Indre (37192)
89. Saint-Flovier (37218)
90. Saint-Hippolyte (37221)
91. Saint-Jean-Saint-Germain (37222)
92. Saint-Laurent-en-Gâtines (37224)
93. Saint-Martin-le-Beau (37225)
94. Saint-Nicolas-des-Motets (37229)
95. Saint-Ouen-les-Vignes (37230)
96. Saint-Quentin-sur-Indrois (37234)
97. Saint-Règle (37236)
98. Saint-Senoch (37238)
99. Saunay (37240)
100. Sennevières (37246)
101. Sepmes (37247)
102. Souvigny-de-Touraine (37252)
103. Sublaines (37253)
104. Tauxigny-Saint-Bauld (37254)
105. Tournon-Saint-Pierre (37259)
106. Varennes (37265)
107. Verneuil-sur-Indre (37269)
108. Villedômain (37275)
109. Villedômer (37276)
110. Villeloin-Coulangé (37277)
111. Vou (37280)
112. Yzeures-sur-Creuse (37282)

== History ==
The arrondissement of Loches was created in 1800. At the January 2017 reorganisation of the arrondissements of Indre-et-Loire, it gained 46 communes from the arrondissement of Tours.

As a result of the reorganisation of the cantons of France which came into effect in 2015, the borders of the cantons are no longer related to the borders of the arrondissements. The cantons of the arrondissement of Loches were, as of January 2015:

1. Descartes
2. Le Grand-Pressigny
3. Ligueil
4. Loches
5. Montrésor
6. Preuilly-sur-Claise
