= Neuilly-le-Brignon =

- Commune
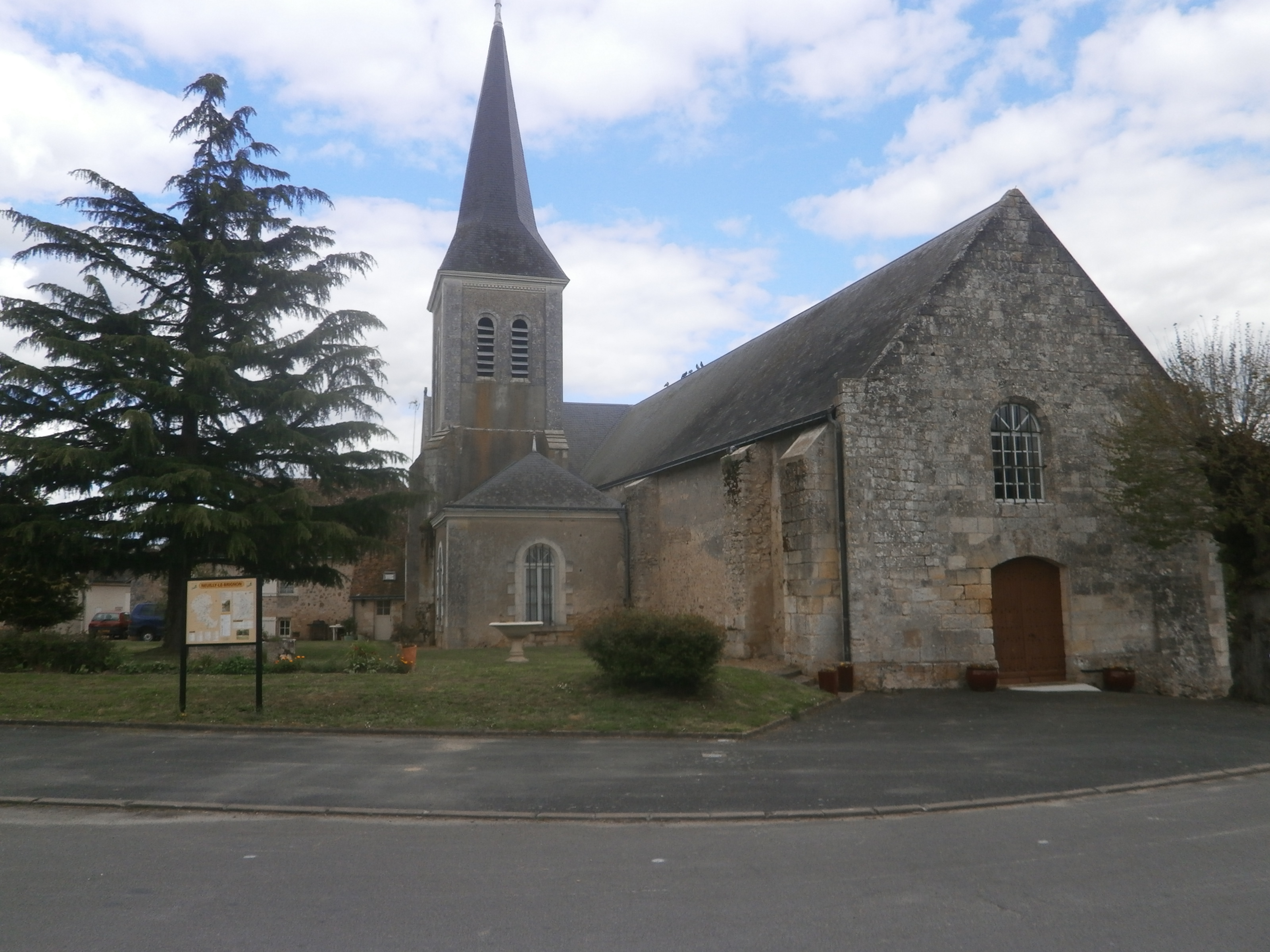
- Church of Saint Saturnin.
- Location of Neuilly-le-Brignon
- Location within France Location within Centre-Val de Loire
- Coordinates: 46°58′32″N 0°47′24″E
- Country: France
- Region: Centre-Val de Loire
- Department: Indre-et-Loire
- Arrondissement: Loches
- Canton: Descartes
- Intercommunality: CC Loches Sud Touraine

Government
  - Mayor (2020–2026): Dominique Cointre
- Area^{1}: 22 km^{2} (8.5 sq mi)
- Highest elevation: 124 m (407 ft)
- Lowest elevation: 62 m (203 ft)
- Population (2023): 278
  - Density: 13/km^{2} (33/sq mi)
- Time zone: UTC+01:00 (CET)
  - Summer (DST): UTC+02:00 (CEST)
- INSEE/Postal code: 37168 /37160
- Website: www.neuillylebrignon.fr
- ^{1} French Land Register data, which excludes lakes, ponds, glaciers > 1 km^{2} (0.386 sq mi or 247 acres) and river estuaries.

Neuilly-le-Brignon (French pronunciation: [nœji lə bʁiɲɔ̃]) is a commune in the Indre-et-Loire department in central France.

It is a small village near Descartes, Le Grand-Pressigny, and Abilly.

== History ==
The village of Neuilly-le-Brignon is mentioned for the first time by Gregory of Tours in the sixth century under the name of Noviliacus vicus and Nobiliacensis pagus. Later versions of the name can be found in references to Parochia de Nuilleis (1195), Nuillé (1234) and Nuilleius (18th century), but from the 15th to the 19th centuries it was most often called Neuillé or Neuilly le Noble, despite receiving its current name in 1793 at the height of the French Revolution.

The church of Saint Saturnin was founded circa 550 by Saint Bauld, the bishop of Tours. The presence of walls of small stonework show that some of the building dates to at least the 11th century. The doorway dates from the 12th century with its typical four orders decorated with flowers, helices, nail heads and a torus decorated with a zig-zag pattern.

== Population ==
Historical population
| Year | Pop. | ±% p.a. |
|---|---|---|
| 1968 | 476 | — |
| 1975 | 381 | −3.13% |
| 1982 | 325 | −2.25% |
| 1990 | 315 | −0.39% |
| 1999 | 307 | −0.29% |
| 2007 | 314 | +0.28% |
| 2012 | 307 | −0.45% |
| 2017 | 300 | −0.46% |
| 2023 | 278 | −1.26% |
Source: INSEE

== See also ==
- Communes of the Indre-et-Loire department
