= La Chapelle-Blanche =

La Chapelle-Blanche may refer to:

- La Chapelle-Blanche, Côtes-d'Armor, France
- La Chapelle-Blanche, Savoie, France
- La Chapelle-Blanche-Saint-Martin, Indre-et-Loire, France

== See also ==
- La Chapelle (disambiguation)
