= Tournon =

Tournon is the name or part of the name of several communes in France:

- Tournon, Savoie, in the Savoie département
- Tournon-d'Agenais, in the Lot-et-Garonne département
- Tournon-Saint-Martin, in the Indre département
- Tournon-Saint-Pierre, in the Indre-et-Loire département
- Tournon-sur-Rhône, in the Ardèche département
