= Mouzay =

Mouzay may refer to the following places in France:

- Mouzay, Indre-et-Loire, a commune in the Indre-et-Loire department
- Mouzay, Meuse, a commune in the Meuse department
