= Sepmes =

- Commune
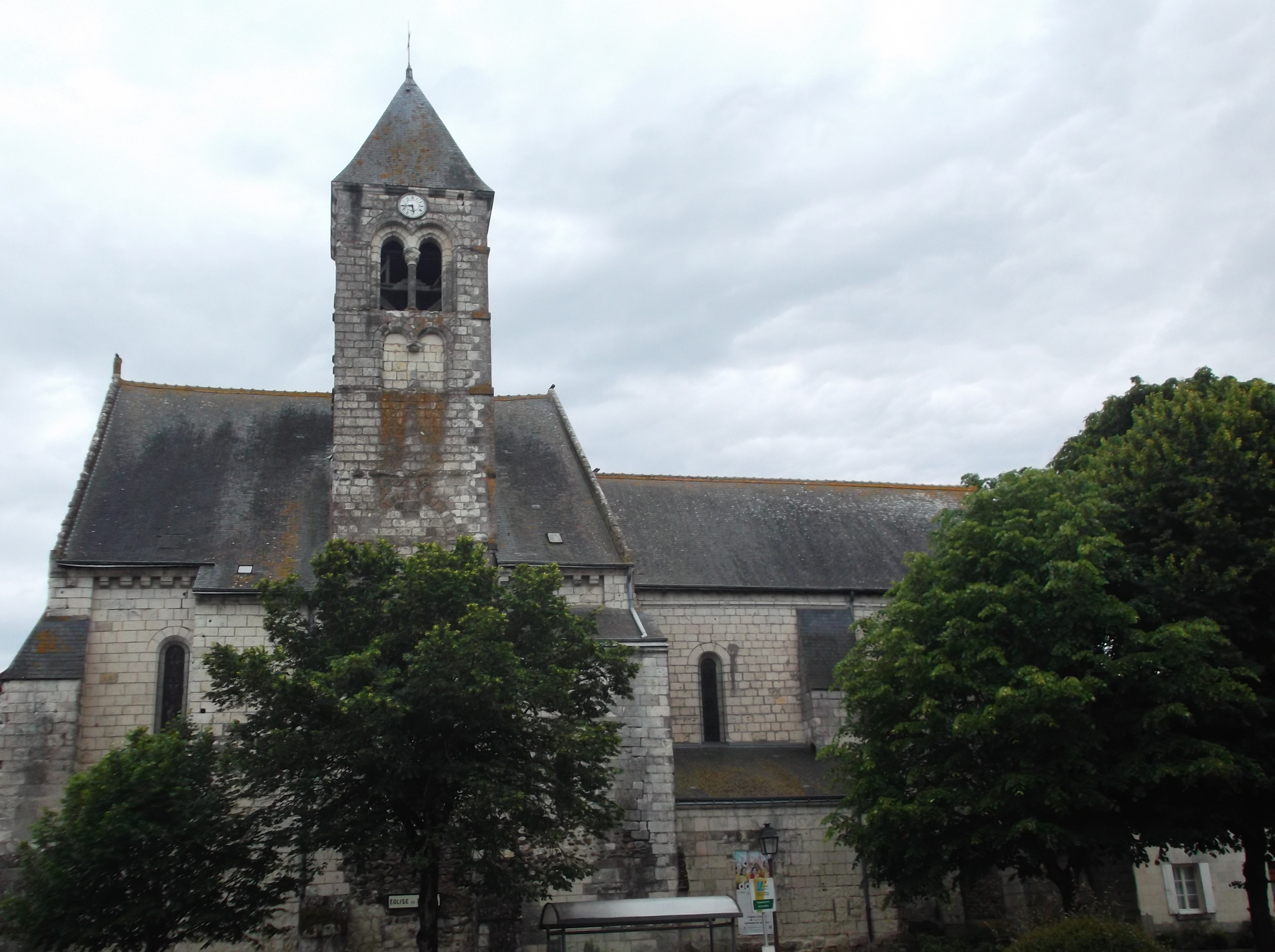
- The church of Our Lady, in Sepmes

- Coat of arms
- Location of Sepmes
- Location within France Location within Centre-Val de Loire
- Coordinates: 47°04′08″N 0°40′28″E
- Country: France
- Region: Centre-Val de Loire
- Department: Indre-et-Loire
- Arrondissement: Loches
- Canton: Descartes
- Intercommunality: CC Loches Sud Touraine

Government
  - Mayor (2020–2026): Régine Rezeau
- Area^{1}: 28.59 km^{2} (11.04 sq mi)
- Highest elevation: 119 m (390 ft)
- Lowest elevation: 60 m (200 ft)
- Population (2023): 604
  - Density: 21.1/km^{2} (54.7/sq mi)
- Time zone: UTC+01:00 (CET)
  - Summer (DST): UTC+02:00 (CEST)
- INSEE/Postal code: 37247 /37800
- ^{1} French Land Register data, which excludes lakes, ponds, glaciers > 1 km^{2} (0.386 sq mi or 247 acres) and river estuaries.

Sepmes (French pronunciation: [sɛm]) is a commune in the Indre-et-Loire department in central France.

== Population ==
Historical population
Year	Pop.	±% p.a.
1968	655	—
1975	547	−2.54%
1982	519	−0.75%
1990	598	+1.79%
1999	645	+0.84%
2007	661	+0.31%
2012	670	+0.27%
2017	630	−1.22%
2023	604	−0.70%
Source: INSEE

== See also ==
- Communes of the Indre-et-Loire department
