= Manthelan =

- Commune
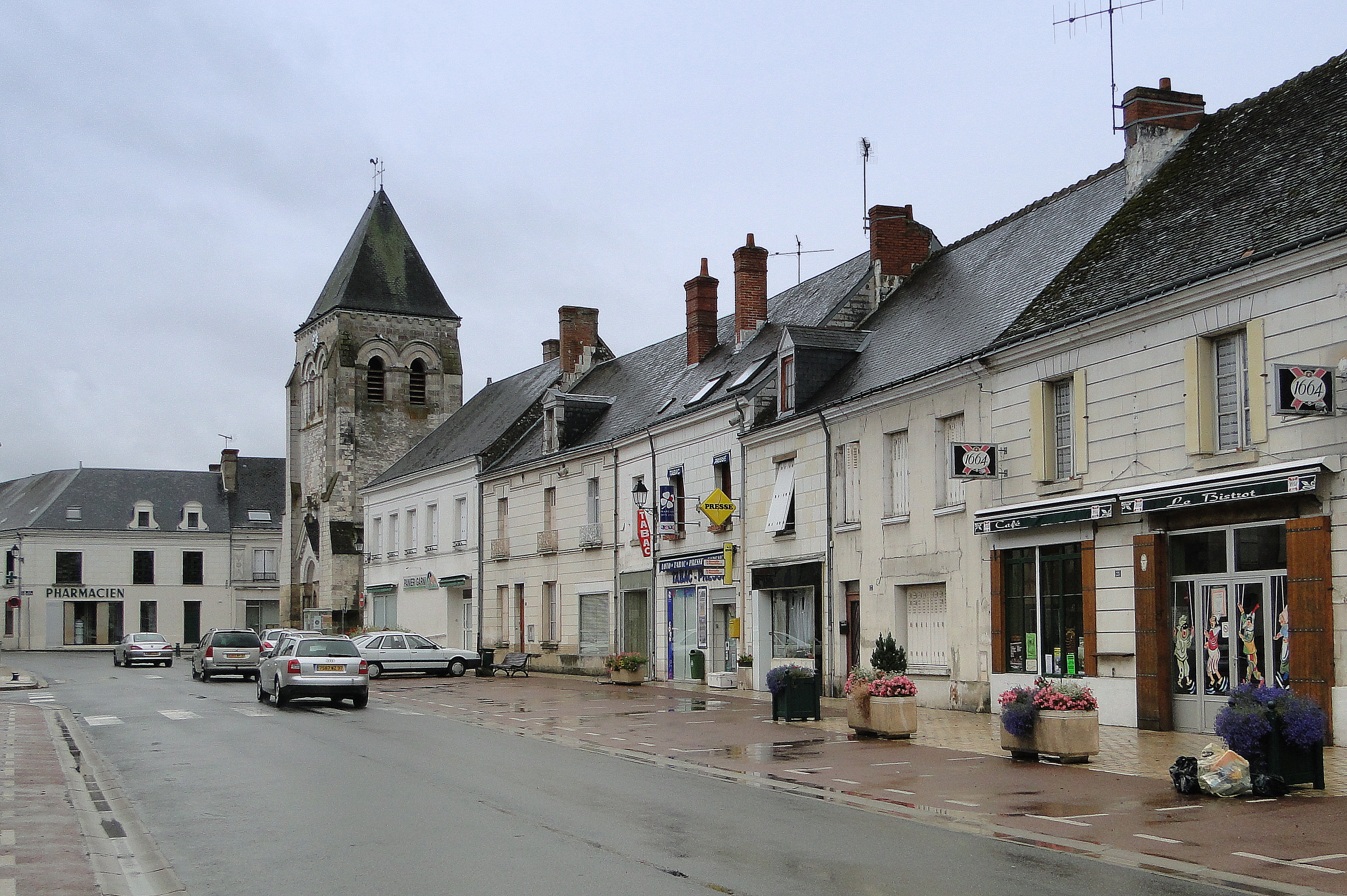
- The shops and church in the centre of Manthelan
- Location of Manthelan
- Location within France Location within Centre-Val de Loire
- Coordinates: 47°08′11″N 0°47′38″E
- Country: France
- Region: Centre-Val de Loire
- Department: Indre-et-Loire
- Arrondissement: Loches
- Canton: Descartes
- Intercommunality: CC Loches Sud Touraine

Government
  - Mayor (2020–2026): Bernard Pipereau
- Area^{1}: 39.58 km^{2} (15.28 sq mi)
- Highest elevation: 128 m (420 ft)
- Lowest elevation: 79 m (259 ft)
- Population (2023): 1,378
  - Density: 34.82/km^{2} (90.17/sq mi)
- Time zone: UTC+01:00 (CET)
  - Summer (DST): UTC+02:00 (CEST)
- INSEE/Postal code: 37143 /37240
- ^{1} French Land Register data, which excludes lakes, ponds, glaciers > 1 km^{2} (0.386 sq mi or 247 acres) and river estuaries.

Manthelan (French pronunciation: [mɑ̃tlɑ̃]) is a commune in the Indre-et-Loire department in central France.

== Population ==
Historical population
| Year | Pop. | ±% p.a. |
|---|---|---|
| 1968 | 1,202 | — |
| 1975 | 1,100 | −1.26% |
| 1982 | 1,093 | −0.09% |
| 1990 | 1,075 | −0.21% |
| 1999 | 1,145 | +0.70% |
| 2007 | 1,317 | +1.76% |
| 2012 | 1,399 | +1.22% |
| 2017 | 1,363 | −0.52% |
| 2023 | 1,378 | +0.18% |
Source: INSEE

== See also ==
- Communes of the Indre-et-Loire department
