= Communauté de communes Loches Sud Touraine =

Federation of municipalities in France

Loches Sud Touraine
- Communauté de communes
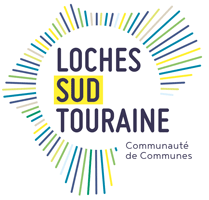

- Country: France
- Region: Centre-Val de Loire
- Department: Indre-et-Loire
- No. of communes: {{{nbcomm}}}
- Established: 1 January 2017

Government
  - President: Gérard Hénault (UDI)
- Area: 1,809.50 km^{2} (698.65 sq mi)
- Population (2018): 51,376
  - Density: 28.392/km^{2} (73.536/sq mi)
- Website: https://www.lochessudtouraine.com/

The Communauté de communes Loches Sud Touraine is a communauté de communes, an intercommunal structure, in the Indre-et-Loire department, in the Centre-Val de Loire region, central France. It was created on 1 January 2017 by the merger of the former communautés de communes of Loches Développement, Montrésor, Grand Ligueillois and Touraine du Sud. Its area is 1,809.5 km^{2}, and its population was 51,376 in 2018. Its seat is in Loches.

== Composition ==
The communauté de communes consists of the following 67 communes:

List of communes in the Communauté de communes Loches Sud Touraine
Name	Code INSEE	Demonym	Area (km^{2})	Population (2021)	Density (per km^{2})
Loches (seat)	37132	Lochois	27.06	6,180	228
Abilly	37001	Habillois	30.27	1,133	37
Azay-sur-Indre	37016	Azéens	13.89	354	25
Barrou	37019	Barrouviens	30.71	469	15
Beaulieu-lès-Loches	37020	Bellilociens	3.88	1,759	453
Beaumont-Village	37023	Beaumontois	19.25	241	13
Betz-le-Château	37026	Castelbessins	46.88	510	11
Bossay-sur-Claise	37028	Bosséens	65.56	724	11
Bossée	37029	Bosséens	19,01	325	17
Bournan	37032	Bournanais	14,67	275	19
Boussay	37033	Boussirons	27,54	215	7,8
Bridoré	37039	Bridoréens	14,54	483	33
La Celle-Guenand	37044	Cellois-Guénandais	36,7	369	10
La Celle-Saint-Avant	37045	Cellois	17,8	1,051	59
Chambon	37048	Chambonnais	17,88	324	18
Chambourg-sur-Indre	37049	Chambourgeois	28,39	1,236	44
Chanceaux-près-Loches	37053	Chancellois	14,58	115	7,9
La Chapelle-Blanche-Saint-Martin	37057	Chapellois	28,5	680	24
Charnizay	37061	Charnizéens	51,71	479	9,3
Chaumussay	37064	Chaumusséens	19,15	211	11
Chédigny	37066	Chédignois	23,17	554	24
Chemillé-sur-Indrois	37069	Chemillois	24,87	234	9,4
Ciran	37078	Ciranais	13,86	423	31
Civray-sur-Esves	37080	Civraysiens	13,29	205	15
Cormery	37083	Cormeriens	6,07	1,818	300
Cussay	37094	Cussayais	25,81	565	22
Descartes	37115	Descartois	38,08	3,294	87
Dolus-le-Sec	37097	Dolusiens	27,27	664	24
Draché	37098	Drachéens	18,51	717	39
Esves-le-Moutier	37103	Esvanais	10,53	149	14
Ferrière-Larçon	37107	Ferrillons	20,87	237	11
Ferrière-sur-Beaulieu	37108	Ferrièrois	19,63	703	36
Genillé	37111	Genillois	63,12	1,492	24
Le Grand-Pressigny	37113	Pressignois	39,55	868	22
La Guerche	37114	Guerchois	5,27	175	33
Le Liège	37127	Liégeois	11,15	326	29
Ligueil	37130	Ligoliens	29,72	2,103	71
Loché-sur-Indrois	37133		74,13	461	6,2
Louans	37134	Louannais	18,02	692	38
Le Louroux	37136	Lourousiens	28,87	529	18
Manthelan	37143	Manthelanais	39,58	1,367	35
Marcé-sur-Esves	37145	Marcéens	10,99	243	22
Montrésor	37157	Montrésoriens	0,98	313	319
Mouzay	37162	Mouzayons	23,71	464	20
Neuilly-le-Brignon	37168	Neuillyssois	22	284	13
Nouans-les-Fontaines	37173	Nouanais	63,31	692	11
Orbigny	37177	Orbignois	65,88	711	11
Paulmy	37181	Palmisois	25,97	237	9,1
Perrusson	37183	Perrussonnais	28,94	1,436	50
Le Petit-Pressigny	37184	Petits Pressignois	32,05	317	9,9
Preuilly-sur-Claise	37189	Prulliaciens	12	1,010	84
Reignac-sur-Indre	37192	Reignacois	22,44	1,313	59
Saint-Flovier	37218	Floviens	29,22	572	20
Saint-Hippolyte	37221	Hippolytains	32,99	613	19
Saint-Jean-Saint-Germain	37222		21,34	749	35
Saint-Quentin-sur-Indrois	37234		27,23	486	18
Saint-Senoch	37238	Saint-Senochois	24,08	518	22
Sennevières	37246		23,54	212	9
Sepmes	37247	Sepmois	28,59	603	21
Tauxigny-Saint-Bauld	37254		40,94	1,693	41
Tournon-Saint-Pierre	37259	Tournonnais	14,76	448	30
Varennes	37265		11,07	257	23
Verneuil-sur-Indre	37269	Vernolliens	39,63	469	12
Villedômain	37275	Villedominis	16,47	123	7,5
Villeloin-Coulangé	37277	Villaloupéens	34,62	588	17
Vou	37280	Vouzéens	21,95	238	11
Yzeures-sur-Creuse	37282	Yzeurois	55,42	1,342	24

== Politics and government ==
=== Intercommunal representation ===
List of presidents of the Communauté de communes Loches Sud Touraine
In office		Name	Party	Capacity	Ref.
3 January 2017	Present	Gérard Hénault	UDI	Mayor of Ferrière-Larçon	
