= Saint-Jean-Saint-Germain =

- Commune
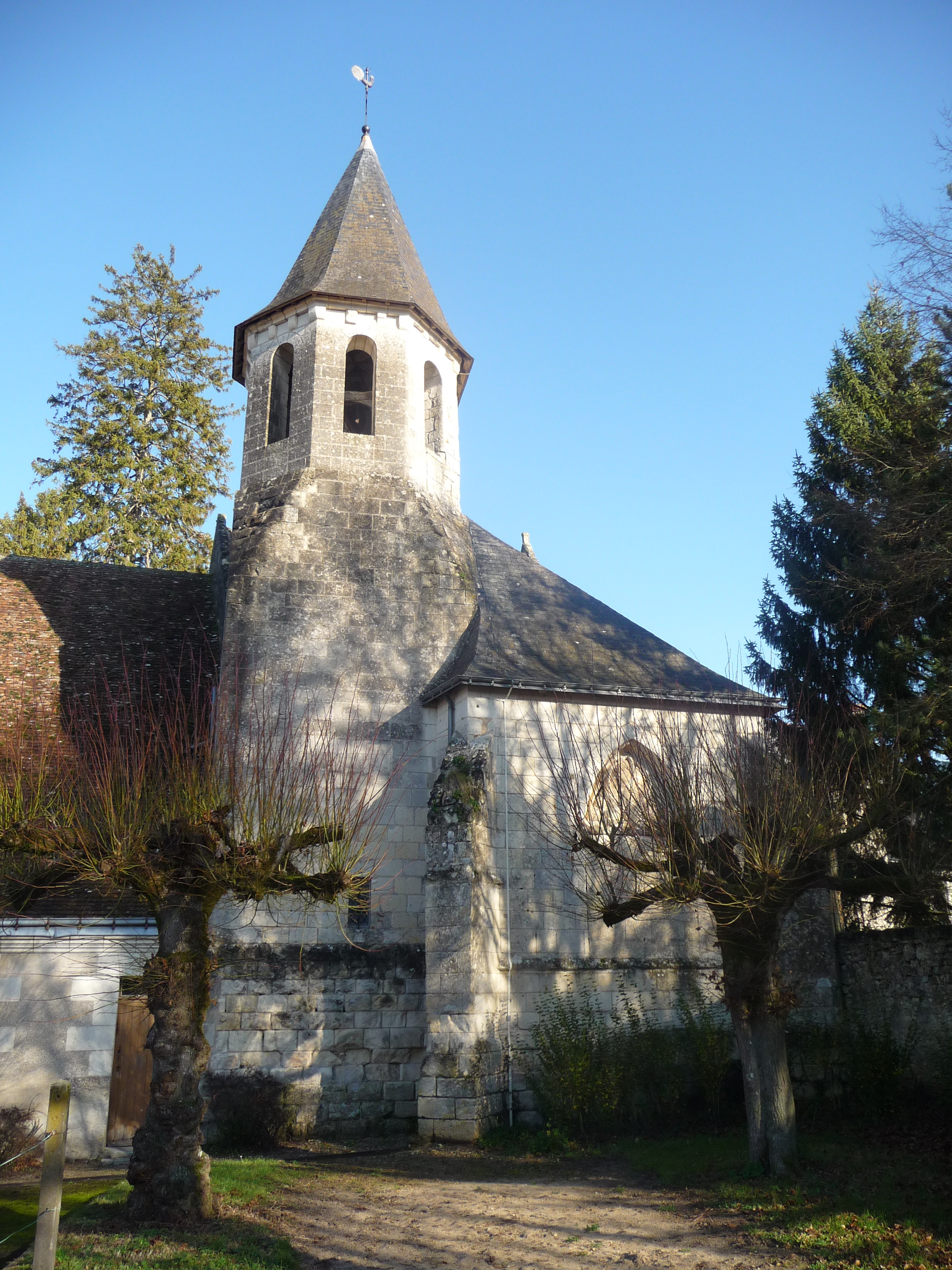
- The church dedicated to Saints Jean and Germain
- Location of Saint-Jean-Saint-Germain
- Location within France Location within Centre-Val de Loire
- Coordinates: 47°05′01″N 1°02′09″E
- Country: France
- Region: Centre-Val de Loire
- Department: Indre-et-Loire
- Arrondissement: Loches
- Canton: Loches
- Intercommunality: CC Loches Sud Touraine

Government
  - Mayor (2020–2026): Joël Pinguet
- Area^{1}: 21.34 km^{2} (8.24 sq mi)
- Highest elevation: 147 m (482 ft)
- Lowest elevation: 72 m (236 ft)
- Population (2023): 745
  - Density: 34.9/km^{2} (90.4/sq mi)
- Time zone: UTC+01:00 (CET)
  - Summer (DST): UTC+02:00 (CEST)
- INSEE/Postal code: 37222 /37600
- ^{1} French Land Register data, which excludes lakes, ponds, glaciers > 1 km^{2} (0.386 sq mi or 247 acres) and river estuaries.

Saint-Jean-Saint-Germain (French pronunciation: [sɛ̃ ʒɑ̃ sɛ̃ ʒɛʁmɛ̃]) is a commune in the Indre-et-Loire department in central France.

== Population ==
Historical population
Year	Pop.	±% p.a.
1968	604	—
1975	553	−1.25%
1982	557	+0.10%
1990	561	+0.09%
1999	602	+0.79%
2007	676	+1.46%
2012	733	+1.63%
2017	762	+0.78%
2023	745	−0.38%
Source: INSEE

== See also ==
- Communes of the Indre-et-Loire department
