= Louans =

- Commune
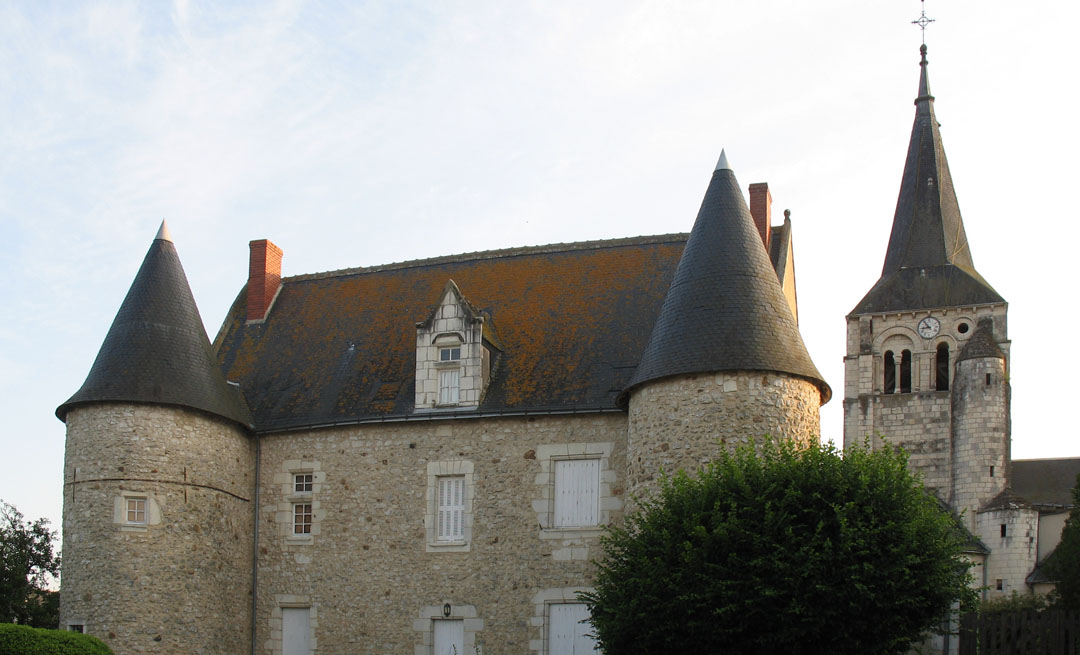
- Buildings in Louans

- Coat of arms
- Location of Louans
- Location within France Location within Centre-Val de Loire
- Coordinates: 47°11′06″N 0°44′51″E
- Country: France
- Region: Centre-Val de Loire
- Department: Indre-et-Loire
- Arrondissement: Loches
- Canton: Descartes
- Intercommunality: CC Loches Sud Touraine

Government
  - Mayor (2020–2026): Anaïs Audiger-Avril
- Area^{1}: 18 km^{2} (6.9 sq mi)
- Highest elevation: 126 m (413 ft)
- Lowest elevation: 99 m (325 ft)
- Population (2023): 709
  - Density: 39/km^{2} (100/sq mi)
- Time zone: UTC+01:00 (CET)
  - Summer (DST): UTC+02:00 (CEST)
- INSEE/Postal code: 37134 /37320
- ^{1} French Land Register data, which excludes lakes, ponds, glaciers > 1 km^{2} (0.386 sq mi or 247 acres) and river estuaries.

Louans (French pronunciation: [lwɑ̃]) is a commune in the Indre-et-Loire department in central France.

== Population ==
Historical population
Year	Pop.	±% p.a.
1968	522	—
1975	494	−0.78%
1982	467	−0.80%
1990	475	+0.21%
1999	543	+1.50%
2007	604	+1.34%
2012	614	+0.33%
2017	648	+1.08%
2023	709	+1.51%
Source: INSEE

== See also ==
- Communes of the Indre-et-Loire department
