= Varennes, Indre-et-Loire =

Varennes
- Commune
- Coat of arms
- Location of Varennes
- Location within France Location within Centre-Val de Loire
- Coordinates: 47°04′13″N 0°55′00″E
- Country: France
- Region: Centre-Val de Loire
- Department: Indre-et-Loire
- Arrondissement: Loches
- Canton: Descartes
- Intercommunality: CC Loches Sud Touraine

Government
  - Mayor (2020–2026): Michel Dugrain
- Area^{1}: 11.07 km^{2} (4.27 sq mi)
- Highest elevation: 142 m (466 ft)
- Lowest elevation: 86 m (282 ft)
- Population (2023): 250
  - Density: 23/km^{2} (58/sq mi)
- Time zone: UTC+01:00 (CET)
  - Summer (DST): UTC+02:00 (CEST)
- INSEE/Postal code: 37265 /37600
- ^{1} French Land Register data, which excludes lakes, ponds, glaciers > 1 km^{2} (0.386 sq mi or 247 acres) and river estuaries.

Varennes (French pronunciation: [vaʁɛn]) is a commune in the Indre-et-Loire department in central France.

== Population ==
Historical population
Year	Pop.	±% p.a.
1968	264	—
1975	221	−2.51%
1982	203	−1.21%
1990	214	+0.66%
1999	210	−0.21%
2007	225	+0.87%
2012	242	+1.47%
2017	246	+0.33%
2023	250	+0.27%
Source: INSEE

== See also ==
- Communes of the Indre-et-Loire department
