= Ligueil =

- Commune
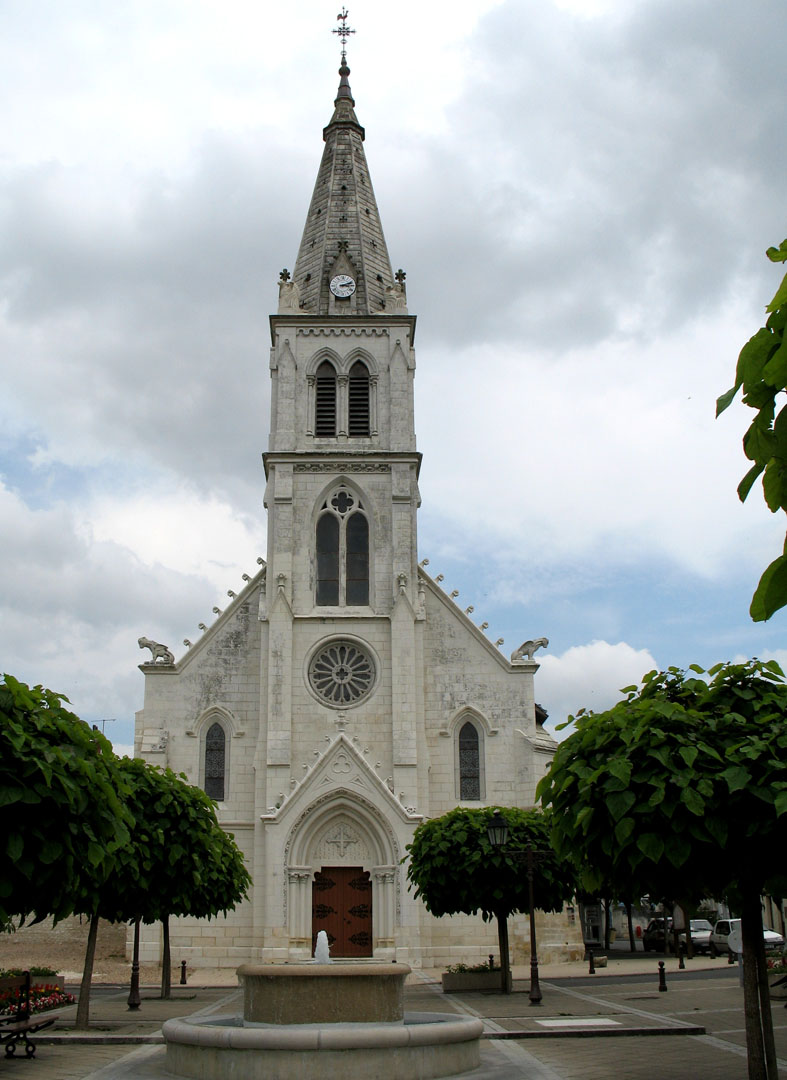
- The church in Ligueil

- Coat of arms
- Location of Ligueil
- Location within France Location within Centre-Val de Loire
- Coordinates: 47°02′37″N 0°49′11″E
- Country: France
- Region: Centre-Val de Loire
- Department: Indre-et-Loire
- Arrondissement: Loches
- Canton: Descartes
- Intercommunality: Loches Sud Touraine

Government
  - Mayor (2020–2026): Michel Guignaudeau
- Area^{1}: 29.72 km^{2} (11.47 sq mi)
- Highest elevation: 128 m (420 ft)
- Lowest elevation: 66 m (217 ft)
- Population (2023): 2,105
  - Density: 70.83/km^{2} (183.4/sq mi)
- Time zone: UTC+01:00 (CET)
  - Summer (DST): UTC+02:00 (CEST)
- INSEE/Postal code: 37130 /37240
- ^{1} French Land Register data, which excludes lakes, ponds, glaciers > 1 km^{2} (0.386 sq mi or 247 acres) and river estuaries.

Ligueil (French pronunciation: [liɡœj]) is a commune in the Indre-et-Loire department in central France.

== Geography ==
Ligueil is close to the former border of Vichy France.

== Population ==
Historical population
Year	Pop.	±% p.a.
1968	2,245	—
1975	2,379	+0.83%
1982	2,413	+0.20%
1990	2,201	−1.14%
1999	2,166	−0.18%
2007	2,175	+0.05%
2012	2,246	+0.64%
2017	2,188	−0.52%
2023	2,105	−0.64%
Source: INSEE

== International relations ==
Ligueil is twinned with:

- Hungerford, United Kingdom

== See also ==
- Communes of the Indre-et-Loire department
