= Draché =

- Commune
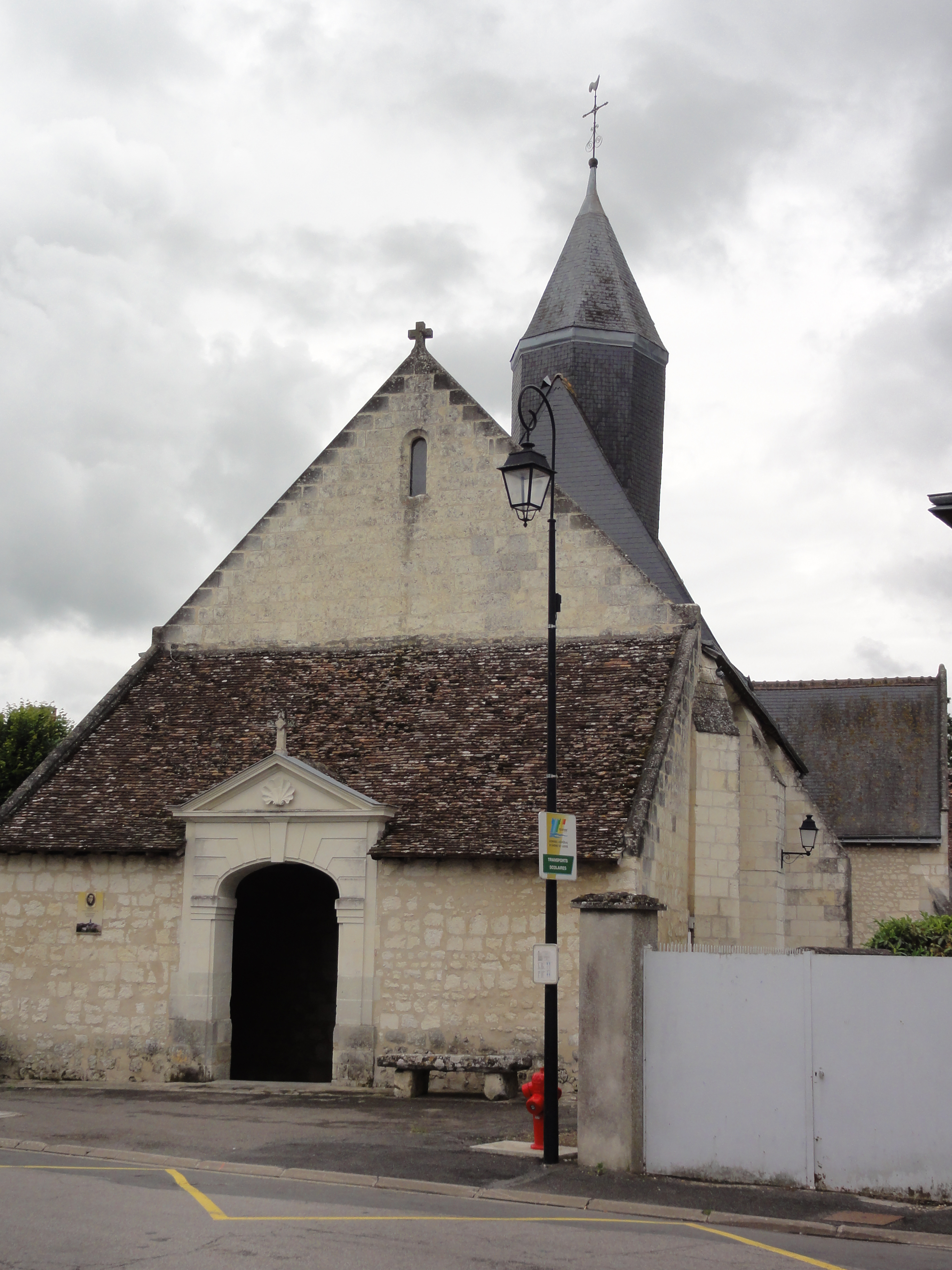
- The church in Draché

- Coat of arms
- Location of Draché
- Location within France Location within Centre-Val de Loire
- Coordinates: 47°03′21″N 0°37′30″E
- Country: France
- Region: Centre-Val de Loire
- Department: Indre-et-Loire
- Arrondissement: Loches
- Canton: Descartes
- Intercommunality: CC Loches Sud Touraine

Government
  - Mayor (2020–2026): Gilles Chapoton
- Area^{1}: 18.51 km^{2} (7.15 sq mi)
- Highest elevation: 112 m (367 ft)
- Lowest elevation: 56 m (184 ft)
- Population (2023): 698
  - Density: 37.7/km^{2} (97.7/sq mi)
- Time zone: UTC+01:00 (CET)
  - Summer (DST): UTC+02:00 (CEST)
- INSEE/Postal code: 37098 /37800
- ^{1} French Land Register data, which excludes lakes, ponds, glaciers > 1 km^{2} (0.386 sq mi or 247 acres) and river estuaries.

Draché (French pronunciation: [dʁaʃe]) is a commune in the Indre-et-Loire department in central France.

== Population ==
Historical population
Year	Pop.	±% p.a.
1968	520	—
1975	521	+0.03%
1982	518	−0.08%
1990	592	+1.68%
1999	635	+0.78%
2007	679	+0.84%
2012	719	+1.15%
2017	745	+0.71%
2023	698	−1.08%
Source: INSEE

The inhabitants are called Drachéens in French.

== See also ==
- Communes of the Indre-et-Loire department
