= Preuilly Abbey (Indre-et-Loire) =

Benedictine monastery in Indre-et-Loire, France

Coordinates: 46°51′12″N 0°55′51″E

Preuilly Abbey (French: Abbaye de Preuilly-sur-Claise; Abbaye Saint-Pierre) was a Benedictine monastery in Preuilly-sur-Claise, Indre-et-Loire, France. The surviving abbey church retains many Romanesque features, notably the intricately carved capitals.

The monastery was founded in 1001 by Effroy, lord of Preuilly and la Roche-Posay, and his wife Beatrice of Issoudun. In 1008 the archbishop of Tours consecrated the altar in the abbey church, which was dedicated to Saint Peter. In 1012 King Robert the Pious granted various privileges. It was pillaged by Protestants in 1562, when the crypt was destroyed. The monastery was suppressed in 1791 in the French Revolution, but the abbey church survived, although with significant damage and unsympathetic restoration in the 19th century, as a parish church.
