= Ciran =

- Commune
- Location of Ciran
- Location within France Location within Centre-Val de Loire
- Coordinates: 47°03′38″N 0°52′24″E
- Country: France
- Region: Centre-Val de Loire
- Department: Indre-et-Loire
- Arrondissement: Loches
- Canton: Descartes
- Intercommunality: CC Loches Sud Touraine

Government
  - Mayor (2020–2026): Jean-Paul Gaultier
- Area^{1}: 13.86 km^{2} (5.35 sq mi)
- Highest elevation: 131 m (430 ft)
- Lowest elevation: 77 m (253 ft)
- Population (2023): 425
  - Density: 30.7/km^{2} (79.4/sq mi)
- Time zone: UTC+01:00 (CET)
  - Summer (DST): UTC+02:00 (CEST)
- INSEE/Postal code: 37078 /37240
- ^{1} French Land Register data, which excludes lakes, ponds, glaciers > 1 km^{2} (0.386 sq mi or 247 acres) and river estuaries.

Ciran (French pronunciation: [siʁɑ̃]) is a commune in the Indre-et-Loire department in central France.

== Population ==
Historical population
Year	Pop.	±% p.a.
1968	396	—
1975	335	−2.36%
1982	293	−1.90%
1990	347	+2.14%
1999	364	+0.53%
2007	429	+2.08%
2012	440	+0.51%
2017	414	−1.21%
2023	425	+0.44%
Source: INSEE

The inhabitants are called Ciranais or Ciranaises in French.

== See also ==
- Communes of the Indre-et-Loire department
