= Bournan =

- Commune
- Location of Bournan
- Location within France Location within Centre-Val de Loire
- Coordinates: 47°03′46″N 0°43′47″E
- Country: France
- Region: Centre-Val de Loire
- Department: Indre-et-Loire
- Arrondissement: Loches
- Canton: Descartes
- Intercommunality: CC Loches Sud Touraine

Government
  - Mayor (2020–2026): Charlie Gillet
- Area^{1}: 14.67 km^{2} (5.66 sq mi)
- Highest elevation: 121 m (397 ft)
- Lowest elevation: 62 m (203 ft)
- Population (2023): 277
  - Density: 18.9/km^{2} (48.9/sq mi)
- Time zone: UTC+01:00 (CET)
  - Summer (DST): UTC+02:00 (CEST)
- INSEE/Postal code: 37032 /37240
- ^{1} French Land Register data, which excludes lakes, ponds, glaciers > 1 km^{2} (0.386 sq mi or 247 acres) and river estuaries.

Bournan (French pronunciation: [buʁnɑ̃]) is a commune in the Indre-et-Loire department in central France.

== Population ==
Historical population
Year	Pop.	±% p.a.
1968	345	—
1975	249	−4.55%
1982	231	−1.07%
1990	200	−1.79%
1999	215	+0.81%
2007	242	+1.49%
2012	270	+2.21%
2017	272	+0.15%
2023	277	+0.30%
Source: INSEE

== See also ==
- Communes of the Indre-et-Loire department
