= Bossée =

- Commune
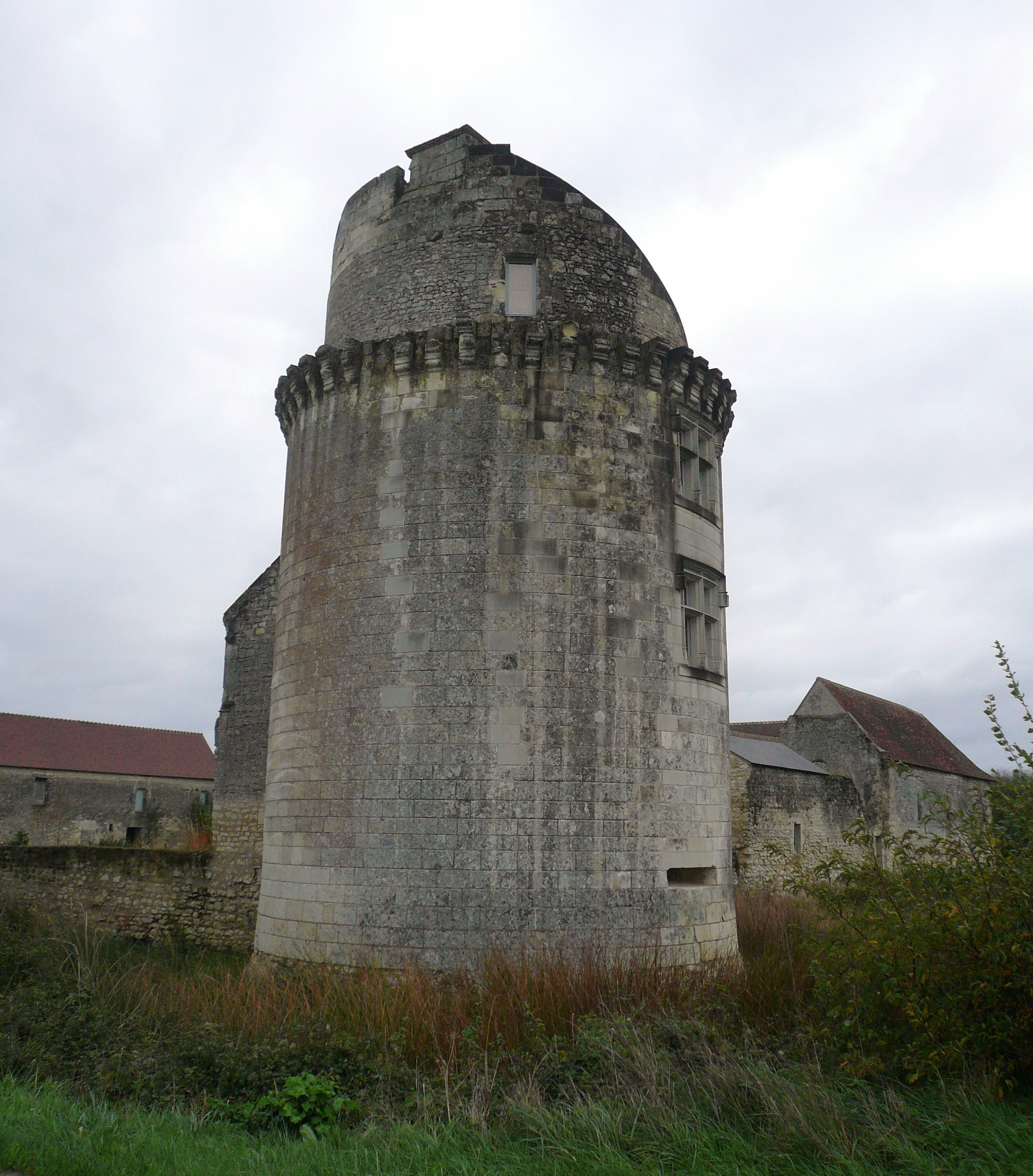
- The south-west tower of the Château de l'Étang
- Location of Bossée
- Location within France Location within Centre-Val de Loire
- Coordinates: 47°06′46″N 0°43′47″E
- Country: France
- Region: Centre-Val de Loire
- Department: Indre-et-Loire
- Arrondissement: Loches
- Canton: Descartes
- Intercommunality: CC Loches Sud Touraine

Government
  - Mayor (2020–2026): Bernard Mereau
- Area^{1}: 19.01 km^{2} (7.34 sq mi)
- Highest elevation: 121 m (397 ft)
- Lowest elevation: 104 m (341 ft)
- Population (2023): 327
  - Density: 17.2/km^{2} (44.6/sq mi)
- Time zone: UTC+01:00 (CET)
  - Summer (DST): UTC+02:00 (CEST)
- INSEE/Postal code: 37029 /37240
- ^{1} French Land Register data, which excludes lakes, ponds, glaciers > 1 km^{2} (0.386 sq mi or 247 acres) and river estuaries.

Bossée (French pronunciation: [bɔse]) is a commune in the Indre-et-Loire department in central France.

== Population ==
Historical population
Year	Pop.	±% p.a.
1968	371	—
1975	300	−2.99%
1982	309	+0.42%
1990	308	−0.04%
1999	334	+0.90%
2007	345	+0.41%
2012	336	−0.53%
2017	330	−0.36%
2023	327	−0.15%
Source: INSEE

The inhabitants are called bosséens in French.

== See also ==
- Communes of the Indre-et-Loire department
