= Esves-le-Moutier =

- Commune
- Location of Esves-le-Moutier
- Location within France Location within Centre-Val de Loire
- Coordinates: 47°02′30″N 0°54′30″E
- Country: France
- Region: Centre-Val de Loire
- Department: Indre-et-Loire
- Arrondissement: Loches
- Canton: Descartes
- Intercommunality: CC Loches Sud Touraine

Government
  - Mayor (2020–2026): Jean-Luc Busin
- Area^{1}: 10.53 km^{2} (4.07 sq mi)
- Highest elevation: 132 m (433 ft)
- Lowest elevation: 86 m (282 ft)
- Population (2023): 159
  - Density: 15.1/km^{2} (39.1/sq mi)
- Time zone: UTC+01:00 (CET)
  - Summer (DST): UTC+02:00 (CEST)
- INSEE/Postal code: 37103 /37240
- ^{1} French Land Register data, which excludes lakes, ponds, glaciers > 1 km^{2} (0.386 sq mi or 247 acres) and river estuaries.

Esves-le-Moutier (French pronunciation: [ɛv lə mutje]) is a commune in the Indre-et-Loire department in central France.

== Toponymy/hydronymy ==
Esves-le-Moutier appears on monastic cartulary in 1199 under the scholarly name "Evya", which also indicates the name of the main small stream. The scholarly writing of the monks substitutes the vowel "u" for the letter y. The trivial meaning is water, "eau" in French actually, but "aqua" in Latin, eve, eave, ewe, evve... in Old French. The Classic Latin word monasterium has also left "moutier" in Old French.

It remains to be explained how "Esves", in the plural form, is written today, which corresponds always to that of the small stream. The Touraine tradition, unlike contemporary hydrological science, places the birth of the stream at the edge of the small sanctuary, a branch of more powerful medieval monasteries. There are indeed several important sources or fountains: the "Red fountains" of royal or public obedience and the great "Saint Martin fountain", always of seigneurial or private obedience. The ultimate hypothesis of a relatinising proposition "(born) ex aquae", namely that the water of the river is deaf from its groundwater, is superfluous.

== Population ==
Historical population
Year	Pop.	±% p.a.
1968	214	—
1975	176	−2.75%
1982	161	−1.26%
1990	156	−0.39%
1999	164	+0.56%
2007	143	−1.70%
2012	156	+1.76%
2017	144	−1.59%
2023	159	+1.67%
Source: INSEE

== See also ==
- Communes of the Indre-et-Loire department
