= Vou =

- Commune
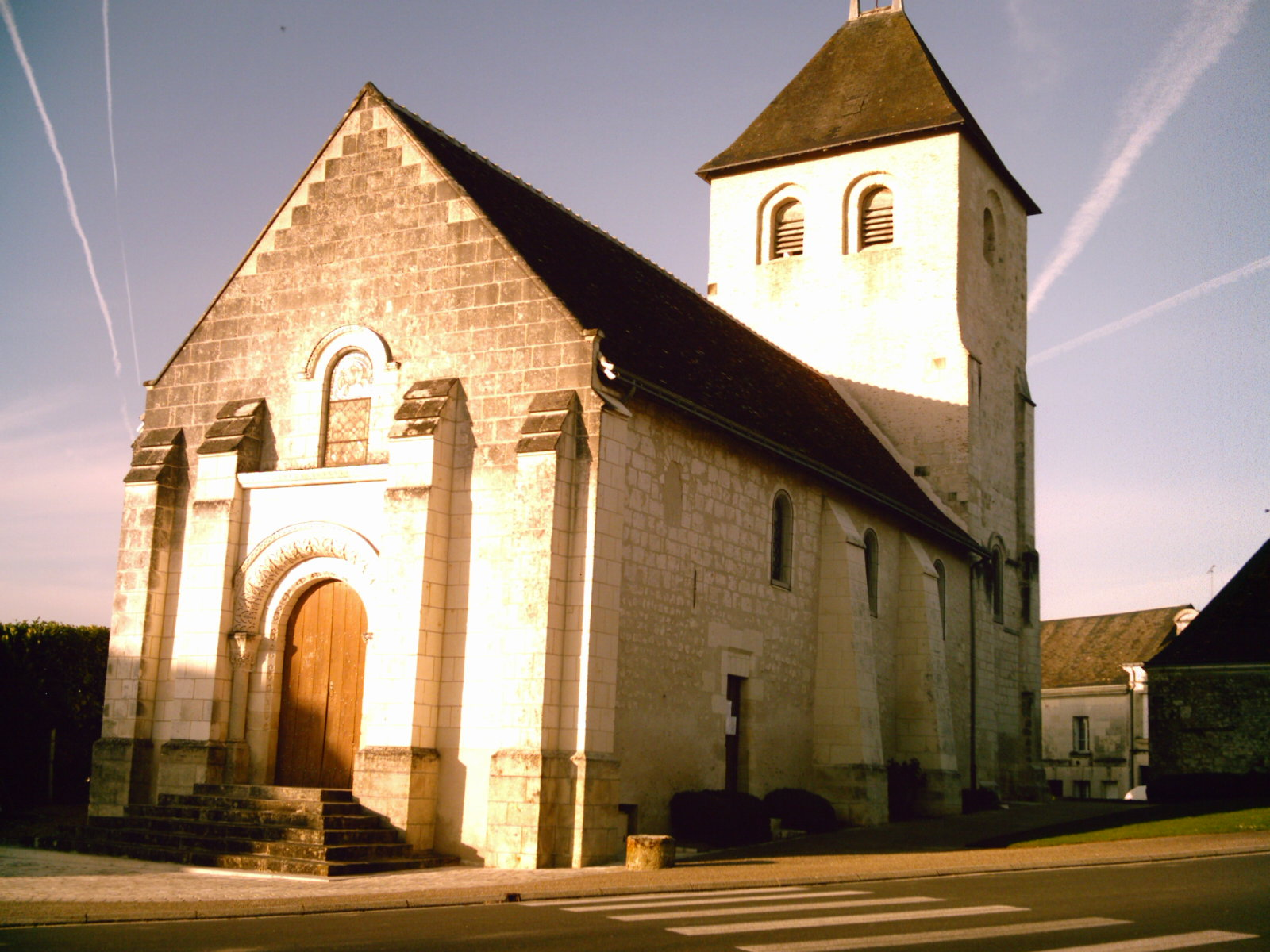
- The church of Saint Pierre, in Vou
- Location of Vou
- Location within France Location within Centre-Val de Loire
- Coordinates: 47°05′10″N 0°51′37″E
- Country: France
- Region: Centre-Val de Loire
- Department: Indre-et-Loire
- Arrondissement: Loches
- Canton: Descartes
- Intercommunality: Loches Sud Touraine

Government
  - Mayor (2023–2026): Carole Guerois
- Area^{1}: 21.95 km^{2} (8.47 sq mi)
- Highest elevation: 134 m (440 ft)
- Lowest elevation: 81 m (266 ft)
- Population (2023): 247
  - Density: 11.3/km^{2} (29.1/sq mi)
- Time zone: UTC+01:00 (CET)
  - Summer (DST): UTC+02:00 (CEST)
- INSEE/Postal code: 37280 /37240
- ^{1} French Land Register data, which excludes lakes, ponds, glaciers > 1 km^{2} (0.386 sq mi or 247 acres) and river estuaries.

Vou is a commune in the Indre-et-Loire department in central France.

== Population ==
Historical population
Year	Pop.	±% p.a.
1968	342	—
1975	257	−4.00%
1982	205	−3.18%
1990	190	−0.95%
1999	234	+2.34%
2007	196	−2.19%
2012	234	+3.61%
2017	199	−3.19%
2023	247	+3.67%
Source: INSEE

The inhabitants are called Vouzéens in French.

== See also ==
- Communes of the Indre-et-Loire department
