= Saint-Flovier =

- Commune
- Location of Saint-Flovier
- Location within France Location within Centre-Val de Loire
- Coordinates: 46°58′08″N 1°01′42″E
- Country: France
- Region: Centre-Val de Loire
- Department: Indre-et-Loire
- Arrondissement: Loches
- Canton: Descartes
- Intercommunality: CC Loches Sud Touraine

Government
  - Mayor (2020–2026): Francis Baisson
- Area^{1}: 29.22 km^{2} (11.28 sq mi)
- Highest elevation: 146 m (479 ft)
- Lowest elevation: 102 m (335 ft)
- Population (2023): 576
  - Density: 19.7/km^{2} (51.1/sq mi)
- Time zone: UTC+01:00 (CET)
  - Summer (DST): UTC+02:00 (CEST)
- INSEE/Postal code: 37218 /37600
- ^{1} French Land Register data, which excludes lakes, ponds, glaciers > 1 km^{2} (0.386 sq mi or 247 acres) and river estuaries.

Saint-Flovier (French pronunciation: [sɛ̃ flɔvje]) is a commune in the Indre-et-Loire department in central France.

== Population ==
Historical population
Year	Pop.	±% p.a.
1968	856	—
1975	750	−1.87%
1982	696	−1.06%
1990	636	−1.12%
1999	605	−0.55%
2007	602	−0.06%
2012	598	−0.13%
2017	566	−1.09%
2023	576	+0.29%
Source: INSEE

== See also ==
- Communes of the Indre-et-Loire department
