= Barrou =

- Commune
- Location of Barrou
- Location within France Location within Centre-Val de Loire
- Coordinates: 46°52′01″N 0°46′17″E
- Country: France
- Region: Centre-Val de Loire
- Department: Indre-et-Loire
- Arrondissement: Loches
- Canton: Descartes
- Intercommunality: CC Loches Sud Touraine

Government
  - Mayor (2020–2026): François Lion
- Area^{1}: 30.71 km^{2} (11.86 sq mi)
- Highest elevation: 146 m (479 ft)
- Lowest elevation: 47 m (154 ft)
- Population (2023): 478
  - Density: 15.6/km^{2} (40.3/sq mi)
- Time zone: UTC+01:00 (CET)
  - Summer (DST): UTC+02:00 (CEST)
- INSEE/Postal code: 37019 /37350
- ^{1} French Land Register data, which excludes lakes, ponds, glaciers > 1 km^{2} (0.386 sq mi or 247 acres) and river estuaries.

Barrou (French pronunciation: [baʁu]) is a commune in the Indre-et-Loire department in central France.

== Population ==
Historical population
Year	Pop.	±% p.a.
1968	626	—
1975	577	−1.16%
1982	551	−0.66%
1990	511	−0.94%
1999	482	−0.65%
2007	487	+0.13%
2012	512	+1.01%
2017	470	−1.70%
2023	478	+0.28%
Source: INSEE

== See also ==
- Communes of the Indre-et-Loire department
