= Betz-le-Château =

- Commune
- Coat of arms
- Location of Betz-le-Château
- Location within France Location within Centre-Val de Loire
- Coordinates: 46°59′34″N 0°55′16″E
- Country: France
- Region: Centre-Val de Loire
- Department: Indre-et-Loire
- Arrondissement: Loches
- Canton: Descartes
- Intercommunality: CC Loches Sud Touraine

Government
  - Mayor (2020–2026): Jean-Claude Galland
- Area^{1}: 46.88 km^{2} (18.10 sq mi)
- Highest elevation: 144 m (472 ft)
- Lowest elevation: 91 m (299 ft)
- Population (2023): 499
  - Density: 10.6/km^{2} (27.6/sq mi)
- Time zone: UTC+01:00 (CET)
  - Summer (DST): UTC+02:00 (CEST)
- INSEE/Postal code: 37026 /37600
- ^{1} French Land Register data, which excludes lakes, ponds, glaciers > 1 km^{2} (0.386 sq mi or 247 acres) and river estuaries.

Betz-le-Château (French pronunciation: [bɛ lə ʃato]) is a commune in the Indre-et-Loire department in central France.

== Population ==
Historical population
Year	Pop.	±% p.a.
1968	1,015	—
1975	857	−2.39%
1982	689	−3.07%
1990	619	−1.33%
1999	594	−0.46%
2007	573	−0.45%
2012	572	−0.03%
2017	571	−0.03%
2023	499	−2.22%
Source: INSEE

== See also ==
- Communes of the Indre-et-Loire department
