= Civray-sur-Esves =

- Commune
- Location of Civray-sur-Esves
- Location within France Location within Centre-Val de Loire
- Coordinates: 47°02′54″N 0°42′42″E
- Country: France
- Region: Centre-Val de Loire
- Department: Indre-et-Loire
- Arrondissement: Loches
- Canton: Descartes
- Intercommunality: CC Loches Sud Touraine

Government
  - Mayor (2020–2026): Patrick Mercier
- Area^{1}: 13.29 km^{2} (5.13 sq mi)
- Highest elevation: 119 m (390 ft)
- Lowest elevation: 59 m (194 ft)
- Population (2023): 212
  - Density: 16.0/km^{2} (41.3/sq mi)
- Time zone: UTC+01:00 (CET)
  - Summer (DST): UTC+02:00 (CEST)
- INSEE/Postal code: 37080 /37160
- ^{1} French Land Register data, which excludes lakes, ponds, glaciers > 1 km^{2} (0.386 sq mi or 247 acres) and river estuaries.

Civray-sur-Esves (French pronunciation: [sivʁɛ syʁ ɛv]) is a commune in the Indre-et-Loire department in central France.

== Population ==
Historical population
Year	Pop.	±% p.a.
1968	266	—
1975	217	−2.87%
1982	167	−3.67%
1990	189	+1.56%
1999	202	+0.74%
2007	194	−0.50%
2012	217	+2.27%
2017	202	−1.42%
2023	212	+0.81%
Source: INSEE

== See also ==
- Communes of the Indre-et-Loire department
