= Marcé-sur-Esves =

- Commune
- Location of Marcé-sur-Esves
- Location within France Location within Centre-Val de Loire
- Coordinates: 47°01′54″N 0°39′18″E
- Country: France
- Region: Centre-Val de Loire
- Department: Indre-et-Loire
- Arrondissement: Loches
- Canton: Descartes
- Intercommunality: CC Loches Sud Touraine

Government
  - Mayor (2020–2026): Gérard Dubois
- Area^{1}: 10.99 km^{2} (4.24 sq mi)
- Highest elevation: 112 m (367 ft)
- Lowest elevation: 56 m (184 ft)
- Population (2023): 251
  - Density: 22.8/km^{2} (59.2/sq mi)
- Time zone: UTC+01:00 (CET)
  - Summer (DST): UTC+02:00 (CEST)
- INSEE/Postal code: 37145 /37160
- ^{1} French Land Register data, which excludes lakes, ponds, glaciers > 1 km^{2} (0.386 sq mi or 247 acres) and river estuaries.

Marcé-sur-Esves is a commune in the Indre-et-Loire department in central France.

== Population ==
Historical population
Year	Pop.	±% p.a.
1968	291	—
1975	278	−0.65%
1982	254	−1.28%
1990	234	−1.02%
1999	227	−0.34%
2007	239	+0.65%
2012	239	+0.00%
2017	242	+0.25%
2023	251	+0.61%
Source: INSEE

== See also ==
- Communes of the Indre-et-Loire department
