= La Chapelle-Blanche-Saint-Martin =

- Commune
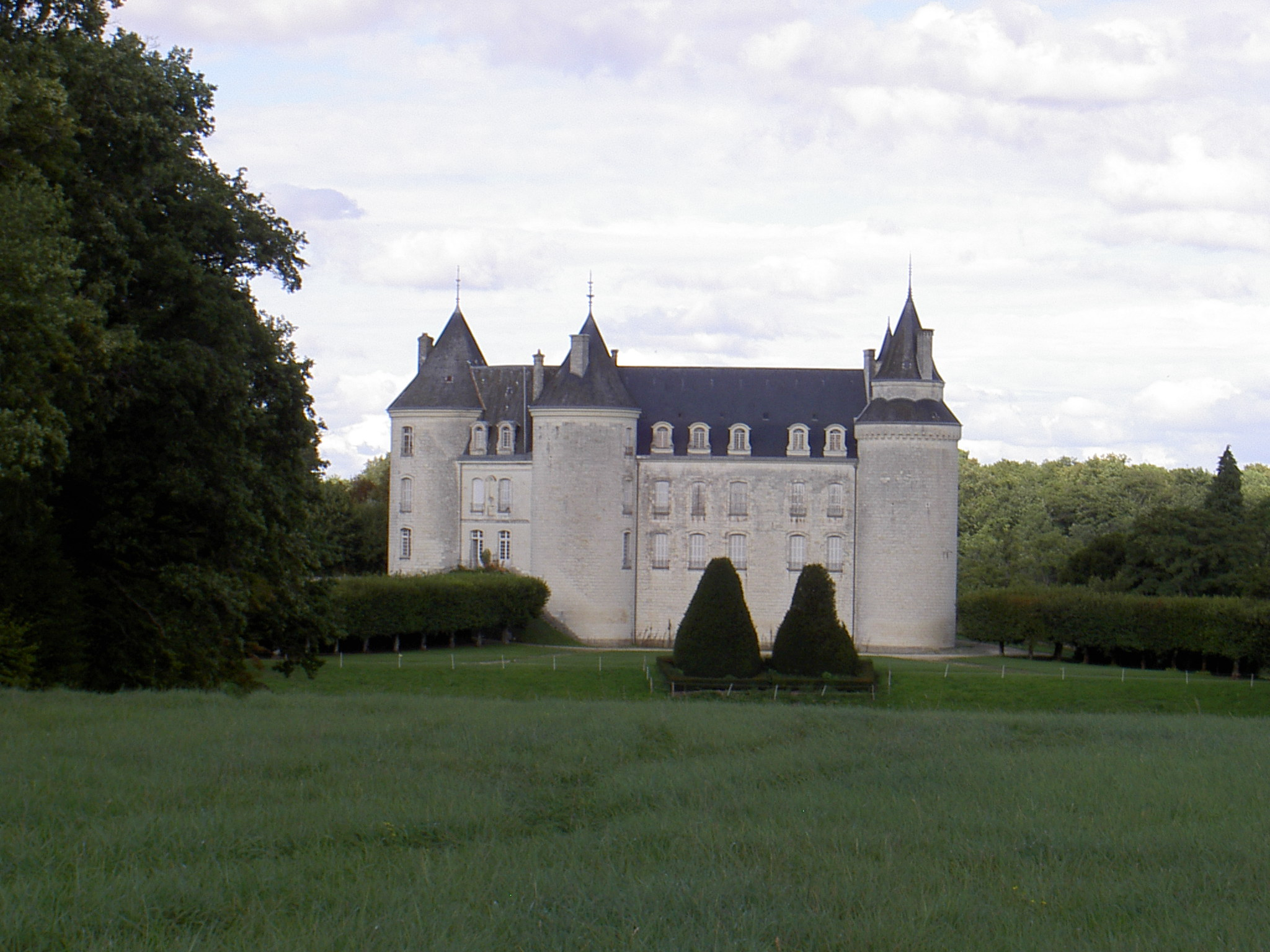
- Chateau of Grillemont

- Coat of arms
- Location of La Chapelle-Blanche-Saint-Martin
- Location within France Location within Centre-Val de Loire
- Coordinates: 47°05′13″N 0°47′35″E
- Country: France
- Region: Centre-Val de Loire
- Department: Indre-et-Loire
- Arrondissement: Loches
- Canton: Descartes
- Intercommunality: CC Loches Sud Touraine

Government
  - Mayor (2020–2026): Martine Tartarin
- Area^{1}: 28.5 km^{2} (11.0 sq mi)
- Highest elevation: 126 m (413 ft)
- Lowest elevation: 67 m (220 ft)
- Population (2023): 688
  - Density: 24.1/km^{2} (62.5/sq mi)
- Time zone: UTC+01:00 (CET)
  - Summer (DST): UTC+02:00 (CEST)
- INSEE/Postal code: 37057 /37240
- ^{1} French Land Register data, which excludes lakes, ponds, glaciers > 1 km^{2} (0.386 sq mi or 247 acres) and river estuaries.

La Chapelle-Blanche-Saint-Martin (French pronunciation: [la ʃapɛl blɑ̃ʃ sɛ̃ maʁtɛ̃]), commonly known as La Chapelle-Blanche, is a commune in the Indre-et-Loire department, central France.

== Population ==
Historical population
Year	Pop.	±% p.a.
1968	717	—
1975	628	−1.88%
1982	609	−0.44%
1990	518	−2.00%
1999	520	+0.04%
2007	609	+1.99%
2012	683	+2.32%
2017	685	+0.06%
2023	688	+0.07%
Source: INSEE

== See also ==
- Communes of the Indre-et-Loire department
