= Cussay =

- Commune
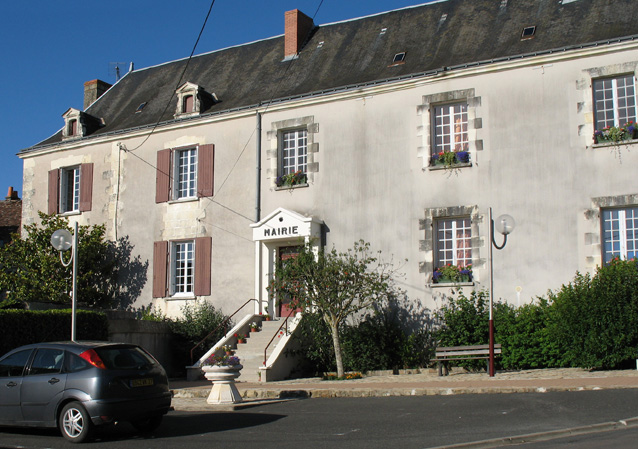
- Town hall
- Location of Cussay
- Location within France Location within Centre-Val de Loire
- Coordinates: 47°01′31″N 0°47′23″E
- Country: France
- Region: Centre-Val de Loire
- Department: Indre-et-Loire
- Arrondissement: Loches
- Canton: Descartes
- Intercommunality: CC Loches Sud Touraine

Government
  - Mayor (2020–2026): Alain Rocher
- Area^{1}: 25.80 km^{2} (9.96 sq mi)
- Highest elevation: 124 m (407 ft)
- Lowest elevation: 65 m (213 ft)
- Population (2023): 571
  - Density: 22.1/km^{2} (57.3/sq mi)
- Time zone: UTC+01:00 (CET)
  - Summer (DST): UTC+02:00 (CEST)
- INSEE/Postal code: 37094 /37240
- ^{1} French Land Register data, which excludes lakes, ponds, glaciers > 1 km^{2} (0.386 sq mi or 247 acres) and river estuaries.

Cussay (French pronunciation: [kysɛ]) is a commune in the Indre-et-Loire department in central France.

== Population ==
Historical population
| Year | Pop. | ±% p.a. |
|---|---|---|
| 1968 | 707 | — |
| 1975 | 583 | −2.72% |
| 1982 | 537 | −1.17% |
| 1990 | 551 | +0.32% |
| 1999 | 560 | +0.18% |
| 2007 | 570 | +0.22% |
| 2012 | 580 | +0.35% |
| 2017 | 570 | −0.35% |
| 2023 | 571 | +0.03% |
Source: INSEE

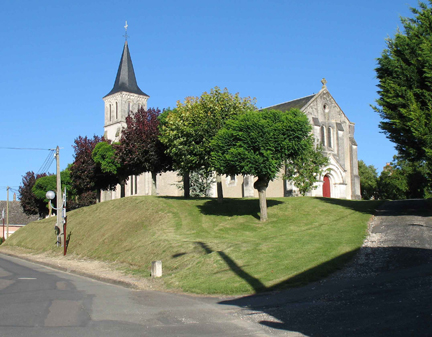
Church

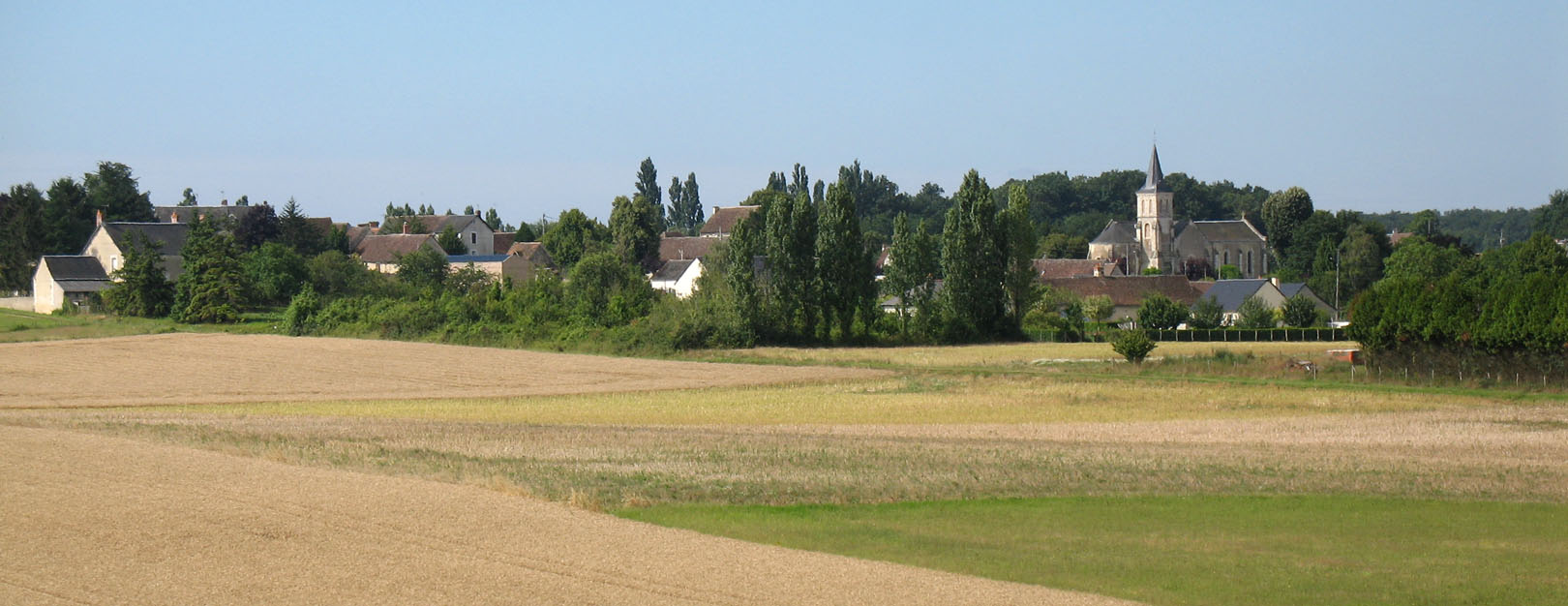
Panorama

== See also ==
- Communes of the Indre-et-Loire department
