= Mouzay, Indre-et-Loire =

Mouzay
- Commune
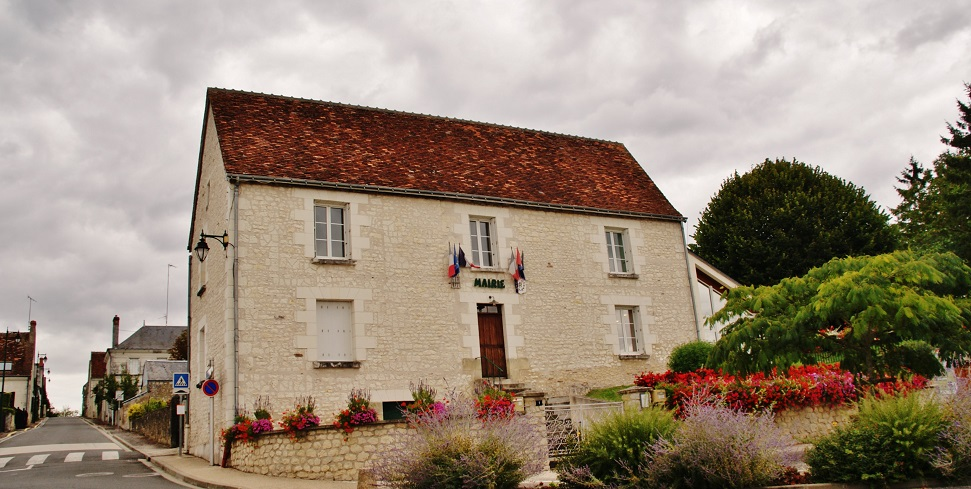
- Mouzay Town hall
- Location of Mouzay
- Location within France Location within Centre-Val de Loire
- Coordinates: 47°05′24″N 0°53′36″E
- Country: France
- Region: Centre-Val de Loire
- Department: Indre-et-Loire
- Arrondissement: Loches
- Canton: Descartes
- Intercommunality: CC Loches Sud Touraine

Government
  - Mayor (2020–2026): Marie Rondwasser
- Area^{1}: 23.71 km^{2} (9.15 sq mi)
- Highest elevation: 146 m (479 ft)
- Lowest elevation: 92 m (302 ft)
- Population (2023): 460
  - Density: 19/km^{2} (50/sq mi)
- Time zone: UTC+01:00 (CET)
  - Summer (DST): UTC+02:00 (CEST)
- INSEE/Postal code: 37162 /37600
- ^{1} French Land Register data, which excludes lakes, ponds, glaciers > 1 km^{2} (0.386 sq mi or 247 acres) and river estuaries.

Mouzay (French pronunciation: [muzɛ]) is a commune in the Indre-et-Loire department in central France.

== Population ==
Historical population
Year	Pop.	±% p.a.
1968	471	—
1975	382	−2.95%
1982	354	−1.08%
1990	438	+2.70%
1999	463	+0.62%
2007	480	+0.45%
2012	489	+0.37%
2017	474	−0.62%
2023	460	−0.50%
Source: INSEE

== See also ==
- Communes of the Indre-et-Loire department
