= Chambon, Indre-et-Loire =

Chambon
- Commune
- Location of Chambon
- Location within France Location within Centre-Val de Loire
- Coordinates: 46°50′37″N 0°48′47″E
- Country: France
- Region: Centre-Val de Loire
- Department: Indre-et-Loire
- Arrondissement: Loches
- Canton: Descartes
- Intercommunality: CC Loches Sud Touraine

Government
  - Mayor (2020–2026): Dominique Maurice
- Area^{1}: 17.8 km^{2} (6.9 sq mi)
- Highest elevation: 132 m (433 ft)
- Lowest elevation: 47 m (154 ft)
- Population (2023): 311
  - Density: 17.5/km^{2} (45.3/sq mi)
- Time zone: UTC+01:00 (CET)
  - Summer (DST): UTC+02:00 (CEST)
- INSEE/Postal code: 37048 /37290
- ^{1} French Land Register data, which excludes lakes, ponds, glaciers > 1 km^{2} (0.386 sq mi or 247 acres) and river estuaries.

Chambon (French pronunciation: [ʃɑ̃bɔ̃]) is a commune in the Indre-et-Loire department in central France.

== Population ==
Historical population
Year	Pop.	±% p.a.
1968	381	—
1975	365	−0.61%
1982	311	−2.26%
1990	288	−0.96%
1999	289	+0.04%
2007	297	+0.34%
2012	318	+1.38%
2017	321	+0.19%
2023	311	−0.53%
Source: INSEE

== See also ==
- Communes of the Indre-et-Loire department
