= La Celle-Saint-Avant =

- Commune
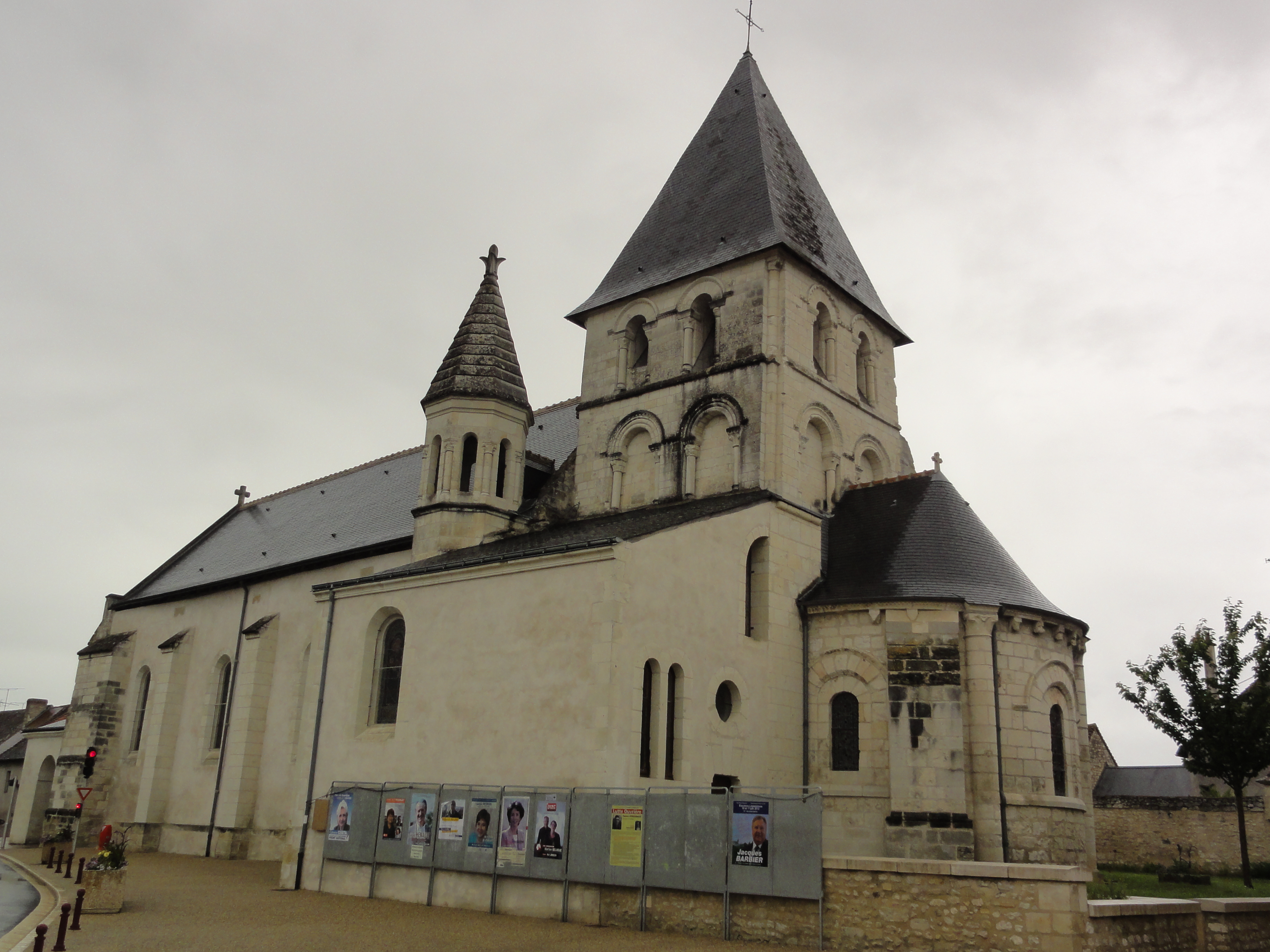
- The church in La Celle-Saint-Avant

- Coat of arms
- Location of La Celle-Saint-Avant
- Location within France Location within Centre-Val de Loire
- Coordinates: 47°01′20″N 0°36′18″E
- Country: France
- Region: Centre-Val de Loire
- Department: Indre-et-Loire
- Arrondissement: Loches
- Canton: Descartes
- Intercommunality: CC Loches Sud Touraine

Government
  - Mayor (2020–2026): Yannick Perot
- Area^{1}: 17.8 km^{2} (6.9 sq mi)
- Highest elevation: 103 m (338 ft)
- Lowest elevation: 37 m (121 ft)
- Population (2023): 1,079
  - Density: 60.6/km^{2} (157/sq mi)
- Time zone: UTC+01:00 (CET)
  - Summer (DST): UTC+02:00 (CEST)
- INSEE/Postal code: 37045 /37160
- ^{1} French Land Register data, which excludes lakes, ponds, glaciers > 1 km^{2} (0.386 sq mi or 247 acres) and river estuaries.

La Celle-Saint-Avant (French pronunciation: [la sɛl sɛ̃.t‿avɑ̃]) is a commune in the Indre-et-Loire department in central France.

== Population ==
Historical population
Year	Pop.	±% p.a.
1968	1,017	—
1975	1,031	+0.20%
1982	1,055	+0.33%
1990	1,095	+0.47%
1999	1,080	−0.15%
2007	1,037	−0.51%
2012	1,029	−0.15%
2017	1,080	+0.97%
2023	1,079	−0.02%
Source: INSEE

== See also ==
- Communes of the Indre-et-Loire department
