= Le Grand-Pressigny =

- Commune
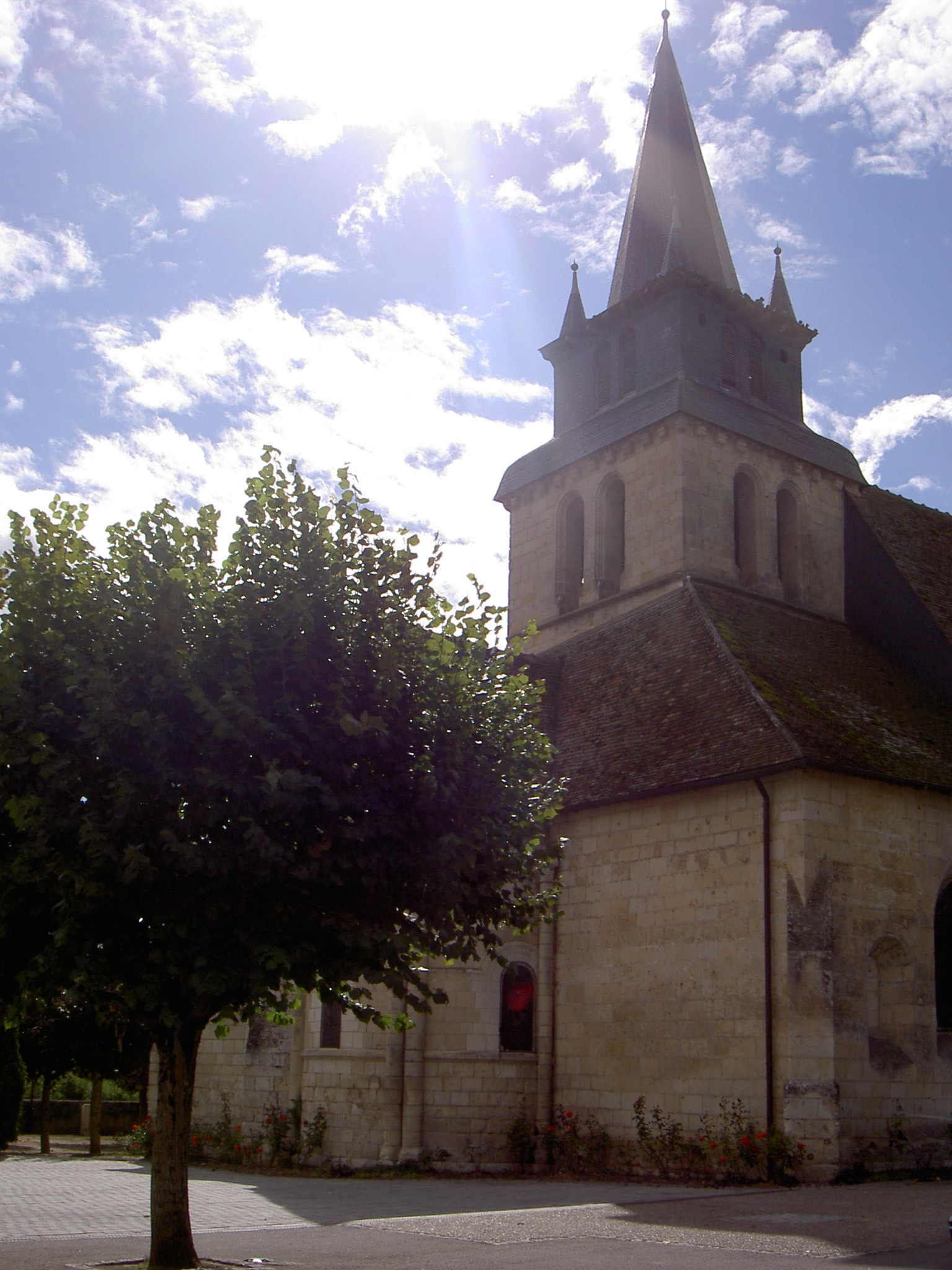
- The church in Le Grand-Pressigny

- Coat of arms
- Location of Le Grand-Pressigny
- Location within France Location within Centre-Val de Loire
- Coordinates: 46°55′16″N 0°48′13″E
- Country: France
- Region: Centre-Val de Loire
- Department: Indre-et-Loire
- Arrondissement: Loches
- Canton: Descartes
- Intercommunality: CC Loches Sud Touraine

Government
  - Mayor (2020–2026): Christophe Le Roux
- Area^{1}: 39.55 km^{2} (15.27 sq mi)
- Elevation: 60 m (200 ft)
- Highest elevation: 135 m (443 ft)
- Lowest elevation: 52 m (171 ft)
- Population (2023): 872
  - Density: 22.0/km^{2} (57.1/sq mi)
- Time zone: UTC+01:00 (CET)
  - Summer (DST): UTC+02:00 (CEST)
- INSEE/Postal code: 37113 /37350
- ^{1} French Land Register data, which excludes lakes, ponds, glaciers > 1 km^{2} (0.386 sq mi or 247 acres) and river estuaries.

Le Grand-Pressigny (French pronunciation: [lə ɡʁɑ̃ pʁesiɲi]) is a commune in the Indre-et-Loire department in central France.

There is a Chalcolithic flint mine located in the commune. It produced an unusual caramel-coloured stone which appears to have been highly prized across Europe with examples found in the Pyrenees, the Netherlands and Switzerland. Blocks of flint and unfinished blanks were traded, as well as finished tools.

== Population ==
Historical population
Year	Pop.	±% p.a.
1968	1,415	—
1975	1,256	−1.69%
1982	1,185	−0.83%
1990	1,120	−0.70%
1999	1,119	−0.01%
2007	1,046	−0.84%
2012	974	−1.42%
2017	916	−1.22%
2023	872	−0.82%
Source: INSEE

== See also ==
- Grimes Graves
- Tony Tebby
- Le Petit-Pressigny
- Communes of the Indre-et-Loire department
