= Preuilly-sur-Claise =

- Commune
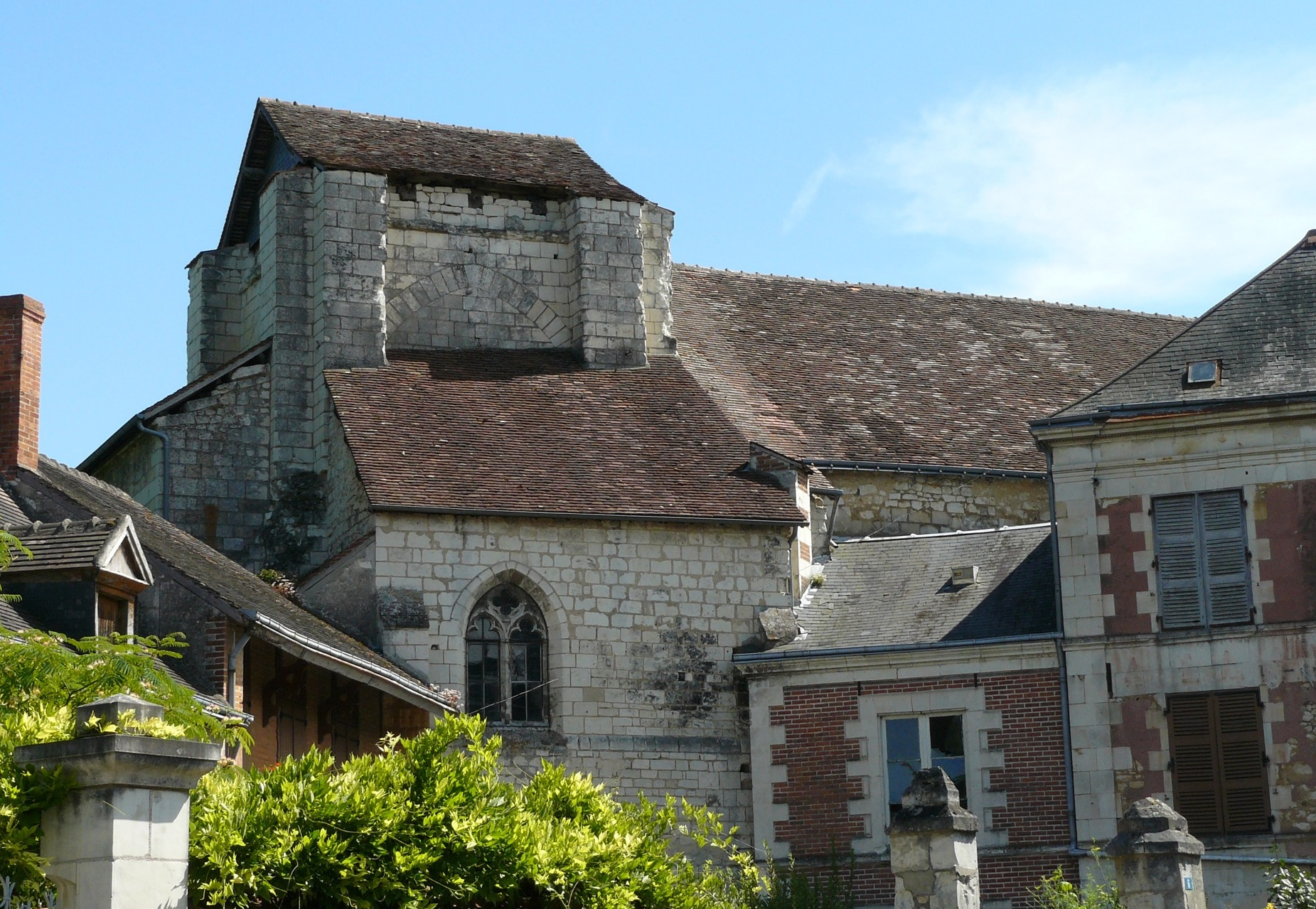
- The church of Our Lady, in Preuilly-sur-Claise

- Coat of arms
- Location of Preuilly-sur-Claise
- Location within France Location within Centre-Val de Loire
- Coordinates: 46°51′20″N 0°55′46″E
- Country: France
- Region: Centre-Val de Loire
- Department: Indre-et-Loire
- Arrondissement: Loches
- Canton: Descartes
- Intercommunality: CC Loches Sud Touraine

Government
  - Mayor (2020–2026): Jean-Paul Charrier
- Area^{1}: 12.00 km^{2} (4.63 sq mi)
- Highest elevation: 137 m (449 ft)
- Lowest elevation: 67 m (220 ft)
- Population (2023): 1,011
  - Density: 84.25/km^{2} (218.2/sq mi)
- Time zone: UTC+01:00 (CET)
  - Summer (DST): UTC+02:00 (CEST)
- INSEE/Postal code: 37189 /37290
- ^{1} French Land Register data, which excludes lakes, ponds, glaciers > 1 km^{2} (0.386 sq mi or 247 acres) and river estuaries.

Preuilly-sur-Claise (French pronunciation: [pʁœji syʁ klɛz]) is a commune in the Indre-et-Loire department in central France.

== Geography ==
Preuilly-sur-Claise is situated at the extreme south of the Touraine at crossroad of Berry (Indre) and Poitou (Vienne) on the Claise river. The village lies 24 km from Descartes, 30 km from Le Blanc, 34 km from Châtellerault and 35 km from Loches. The largest city in Indre et Loire is Tours, and the other biggest one outside the department is Poitiers (Poitou)

== History ==
In 1814, Preuilly-sur-Claise annexed the commune of Saint-Michel-du-Bois.

Preuilly Abbey, a Benedictine monastery, was founded here in the year 1001. It was suppressed in 1791 during the French Revolution, but the Romanesque abbey church dedicated to Saint Peter has survived.

== Education ==
A kindergarten, a grade school and a secondary school (Collège Gaston Defferre) (Public) and another private secondary school (Collège Notre-Dame)

== Sport ==
A football stadium, two tennis courts, a basketball court, minigolf site and a Pétanque ground are situated near the river. The camping site is near the swimming pool and a green area with a pond and games for children. A gymnasium with a climbing wall permit diverse sports practising like badminton, basketball, handball, football, tennis, ping pong. Community youth center welcomed diverse activities like dance, gymnastics, yoga, body building.

Racing cyclist Léon Georget — "The Father of the Bol d'Or" — was born in Preuilly-sur-Claise.

== Transport ==
Direct bus from/to Tours (G line) 2 times per day for less than €2 (about an hour and a half from Preuilly to the Tours station), bus to Loches too (LMA line).

== Activities ==
Children's outdoor activity centre is opened for children from 3 to 16 years old on Easter Holidays and summer holidays.

== Health ==
Doctor, dentists, chemists, optician, speech therapist, staff nurse, veterinarian.

== Population ==
Historical population
Year	Pop.	±% p.a.
1968	1,579	—
1975	1,603	+0.22%
1982	1,553	−0.45%
1990	1,427	−1.05%
1999	1,293	−1.09%
2007	1,103	−1.97%
2012	1,048	−1.02%
2017	1,003	−0.87%
2023	1,011	+0.13%
Source: INSEE

== See also ==
- Communes of the Indre-et-Loire department
