= Canton of Descartes =

Division of the Indre-et-Loire department, France

Coordinates: 46.98°N 0.70°E

The canton of Descartes is an administrative division of the Indre-et-Loire department, central France. Its borders were modified at the French canton reorganisation which came into effect in March 2015. Its seat is in Descartes.

It consists of the following communes:

1. Abilly
2. Barrou
3. Betz-le-Château
4. Bossay-sur-Claise
5. Bossée
6. Bournan
7. Boussay
8. La Celle-Guenand
9. La Celle-Saint-Avant
10. Chambon
11. La Chapelle-Blanche-Saint-Martin
12. Charnizay
13. Chaumussay
14. Ciran
15. Civray-sur-Esves
16. Cussay
17. Descartes
18. Draché
19. Esves-le-Moutier
20. Ferrière-Larçon
21. Le Grand-Pressigny
22. La Guerche
23. Ligueil
24. Louans
25. Le Louroux
26. Manthelan
27. Marcé-sur-Esves
28. Mouzay
29. Neuilly-le-Brignon
30. Paulmy
31. Le Petit-Pressigny
32. Preuilly-sur-Claise
33. Saint-Flovier
34. Sepmes
35. Tournon-Saint-Pierre
36. Varennes
37. Vou
38. Yzeures-sur-Creuse
