= Chaumussay =

- Commune
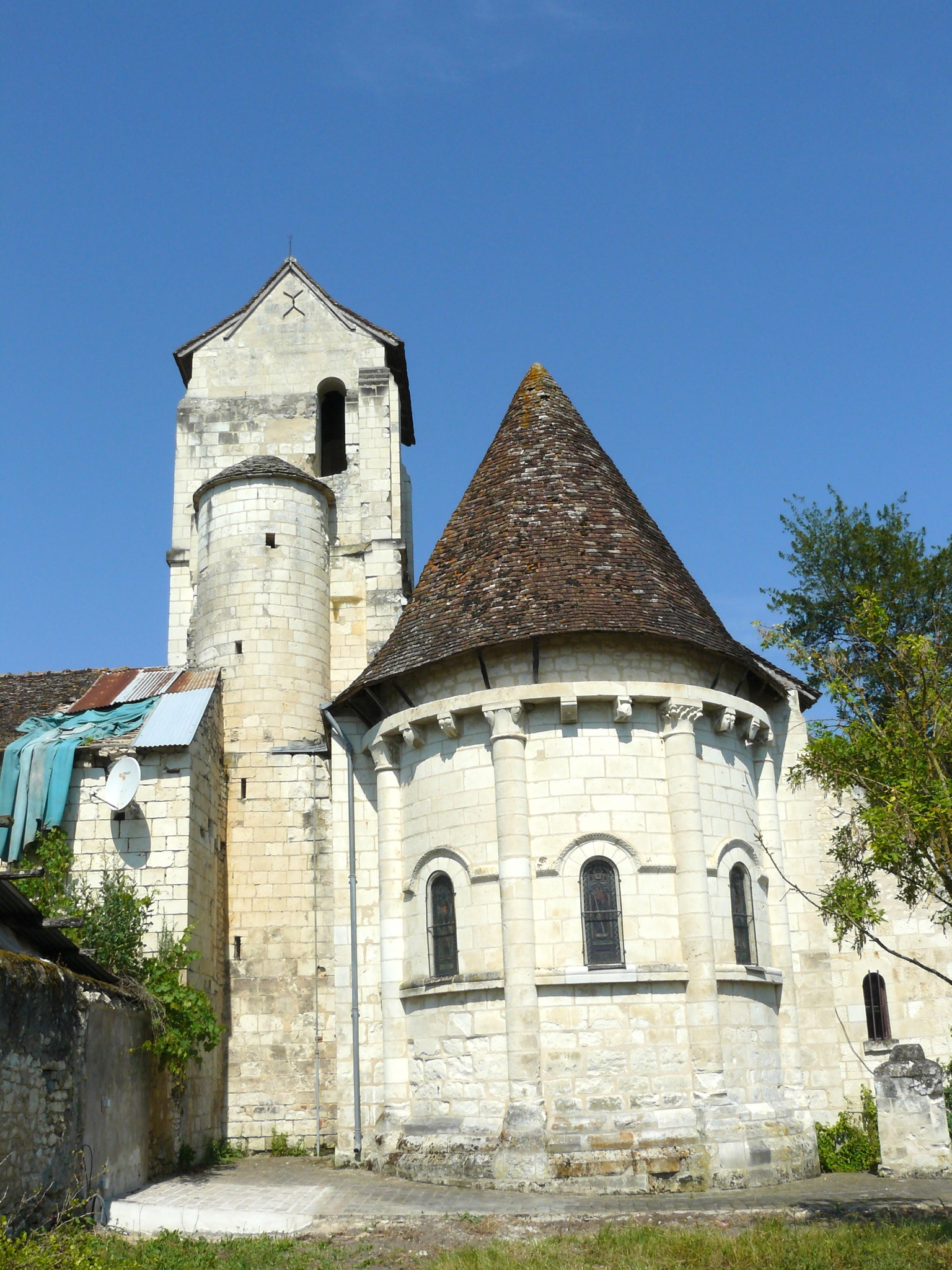
- The apse of the Church of Saint-Médard, in Chaumussay

- Coat of arms
- Location of Chaumussay
- Location within France Location within Centre-Val de Loire
- Coordinates: 46°52′18″N 0°51′45″E
- Country: France
- Region: Centre-Val de Loire
- Department: Indre-et-Loire
- Arrondissement: Loches
- Canton: Descartes
- Intercommunality: CC Loches Sud Touraine

Government
  - Mayor (2020–2026): Marie-Thérèse Bruneau
- Area^{1}: 19.15 km^{2} (7.39 sq mi)
- Highest elevation: 135 m (443 ft)
- Lowest elevation: 60 m (200 ft)
- Population (2023): 199
  - Density: 10.4/km^{2} (26.9/sq mi)
- Time zone: UTC+01:00 (CET)
  - Summer (DST): UTC+02:00 (CEST)
- INSEE/Postal code: 37064 /37359
- ^{1} French Land Register data, which excludes lakes, ponds, glaciers > 1 km^{2} (0.386 sq mi or 247 acres) and river estuaries.

Chaumussay (French pronunciation: [ʃomysɛ]) is a commune in the Indre-et-Loire department in central France.

== Population ==
Historical population
Year	Pop.	±% p.a.
1968	504	—
1975	345	−5.27%
1982	300	−1.98%
1990	287	−0.55%
1999	262	−1.01%
2007	254	−0.39%
2012	246	−0.64%
2017	226	−1.68%
2023	199	−2.10%
Source: INSEE

== See also ==
- Communes of the Indre-et-Loire department
