= Abilly =

- Commune
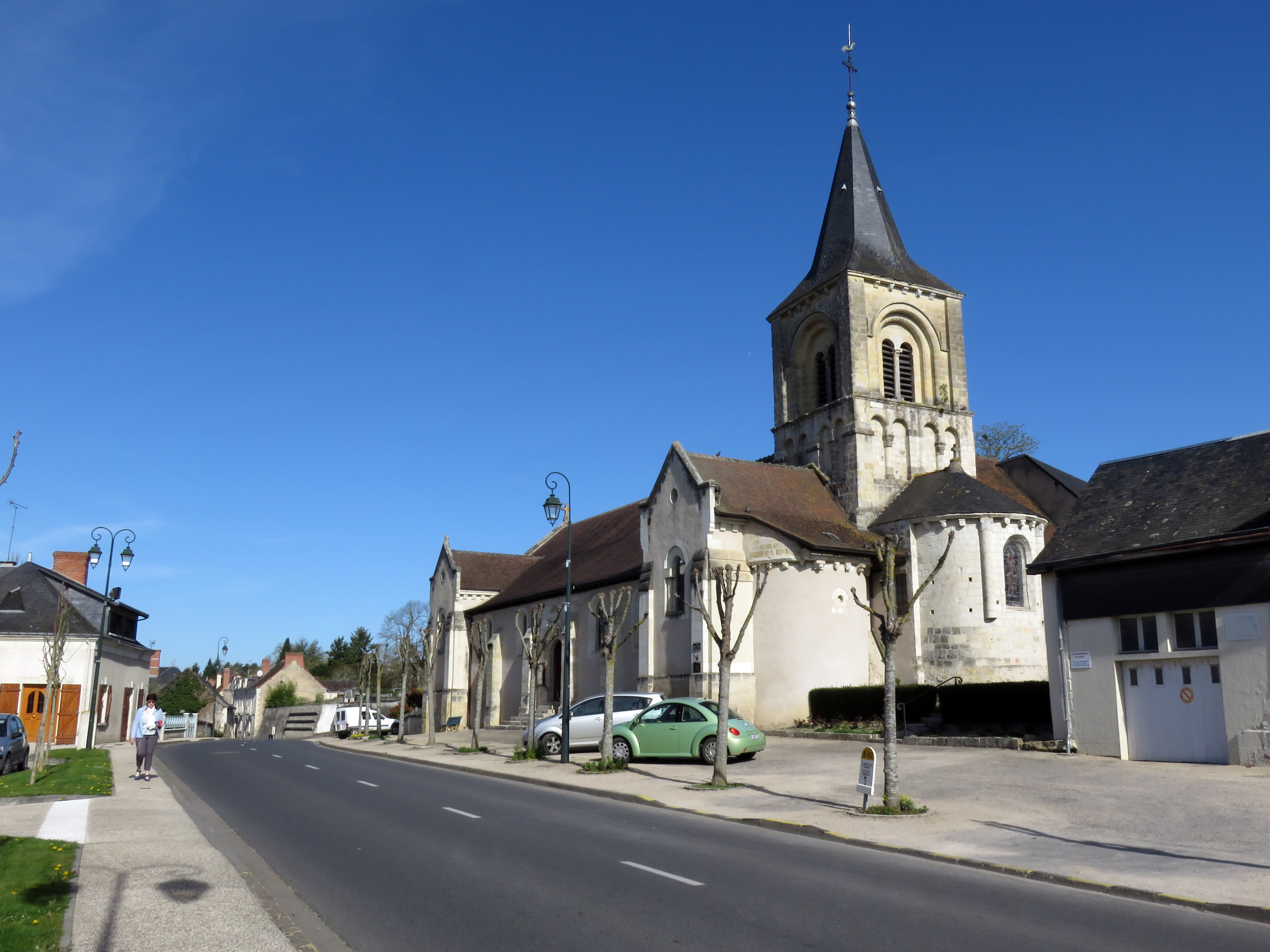
- St. Martin Church

- Coat of arms
- Location of Abilly
- Location within France Location within Centre-Val de Loire
- Coordinates: 46°56′31″N 0°43′43″E
- Country: France
- Region: Centre-Val de Loire
- Department: Indre-et-Loire
- Arrondissement: Loches
- Canton: Descartes
- Intercommunality: Loches Sud Touraine

Government
  - Mayor (2020–2026): Christophe Dujon
- Area^{1}: 30.27 km^{2} (11.69 sq mi)
- Highest elevation: 123 m (404 ft)
- Lowest elevation: 42 m (138 ft)
- Population (2023): 1,116
  - Density: 36.87/km^{2} (95.49/sq mi)
- Demonym(s): Habillois, Habilloises
- Time zone: UTC+01:00 (CET)
  - Summer (DST): UTC+02:00 (CEST)
- INSEE/Postal code: 37001 /37160
- ^{1} French Land Register data, which excludes lakes, ponds, glaciers > 1 km^{2} (0.386 sq mi or 247 acres) and river estuaries.

Abilly (French pronunciation: [abiji]) is a commune in the Indre-et-Loire department in central France.

== Population ==
Historical population

Year	Pop.	±% p.a.
1793	660	—
1800	600	−1.35%
1806	634	+0.92%
1821	695	+0.61%
1831	791	+1.30%
1836	913	+2.91%
1841	986	+1.55%
1846	1,023	+0.74%
1851	1,146	+2.30%
1856	1,192	+0.79%
1861	1,430	+3.71%
1866	1,475	+0.62%
1872	1,259	−2.60%
1876	1,444	+3.49%
1881	1,378	−0.93%
1886	1,288	−1.34%
1891	1,218	−1.11%
1896	1,262	+0.71%
1901	1,158	−1.71%

Year	Pop.	±% p.a.
1906	1,155	−0.05%
1911	1,172	+0.29%
1921	1,167	−0.04%
1926	1,243	+1.27%
1931	1,210	−0.54%
1936	1,191	−0.32%
1946	1,156	−0.30%
1954	1,189	+0.35%
1962	1,205	+0.17%
1968	1,224	+0.26%
1975	1,174	−0.59%
1982	1,166	−0.10%
1990	1,145	−0.23%
1999	1,109	−0.35%
2007	1,088	−0.24%
2012	1,138	+0.90%
2017	1,151	+0.23%
2023	1,116	−0.51%

Source: EHESS (1793-1999) and INSEE

== See also ==
- Communes of the Indre-et-Loire department
