= Tournon-Saint-Pierre =

- Commune
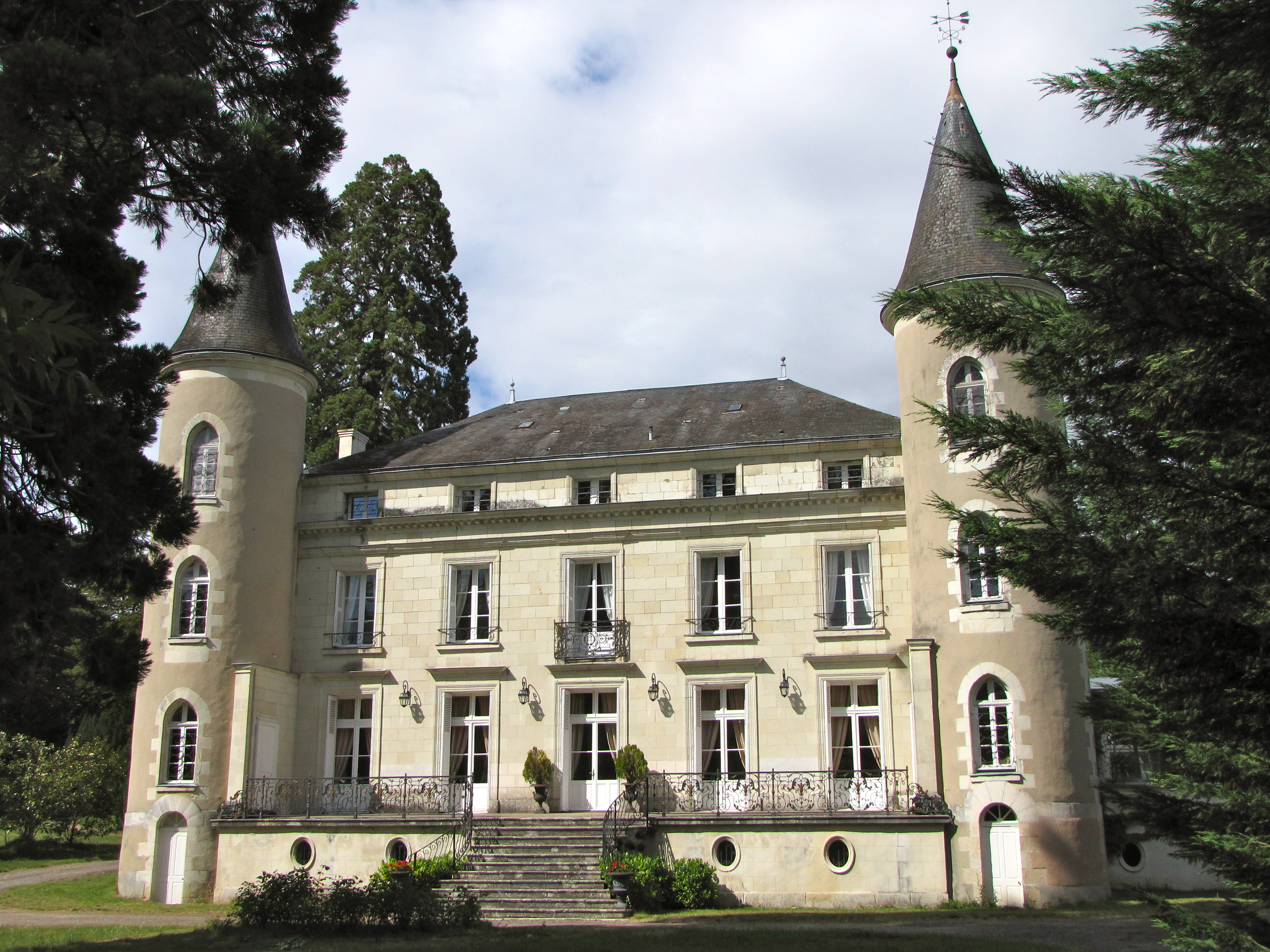
- Chateau Les Vallées
- Location of Tournon-Saint-Pierre
- Location within France Location within Centre-Val de Loire
- Coordinates: 46°44′24″N 0°57′17″E
- Country: France
- Region: Centre-Val de Loire
- Department: Indre-et-Loire
- Arrondissement: Loches
- Canton: Descartes
- Intercommunality: CC Loches Sud Touraine

Government
  - Mayor (2020–2026): Nicole Thibault
- Area^{1}: 14.76 km^{2} (5.70 sq mi)
- Highest elevation: 136 m (446 ft)
- Lowest elevation: 62 m (203 ft)
- Population (2023): 426
  - Density: 28.9/km^{2} (74.8/sq mi)
- Time zone: UTC+01:00 (CET)
  - Summer (DST): UTC+02:00 (CEST)
- INSEE/Postal code: 37259 /37290
- ^{1} French Land Register data, which excludes lakes, ponds, glaciers > 1 km^{2} (0.386 sq mi or 247 acres) and river estuaries.

Tournon-Saint-Pierre (French pronunciation: [tuʁnɔ̃ sɛ̃ pjɛʁ]) is a commune in the Indre-et-Loire department in central France.

== Population ==
Historical population
Year	Pop.	±% p.a.
1968	644	—
1975	608	−0.82%
1982	574	−0.82%
1990	593	+0.41%
1999	514	−1.58%
2007	510	−0.10%
2012	459	−2.09%
2017	459	+0.00%
2023	426	−1.24%
Source: INSEE

== Sights ==
The Château des Vallées is located in Tournon-Saint-Pierre.

== See also ==
- Communes of the Indre-et-Loire department
