= Champeigne tourangelle =

Natural micro-region in France

Champeigne tourangelle is a natural micro-region east of Touraine located southeast of Tours.

This grain growing micro-region, classified Natura 2000, extends between the Cher Valley, Sainte-Maure de Touraine Plateau and Gâtine Tourangelle of Loches. Composed of two limestone plates cut by the valleys of the Indre river and the Indrois river, it covers all or part of the territories of the following municipalities: Athée-sur-Cher, Azay-sur-Indre, Bléré, Chambourg-sur-Indre, Chanceaux-près-Loches, Chédigny, Cigogné, Cormery, Courcay, fr:Dolus-le-sec, Genillé, Le Liège, Luzillé, Reignac-sur-Indre, Saint-Quentin-sur-Indrois, Sublaines et Tauxigny.
