= Chambourg-sur-Indre =

- Commune
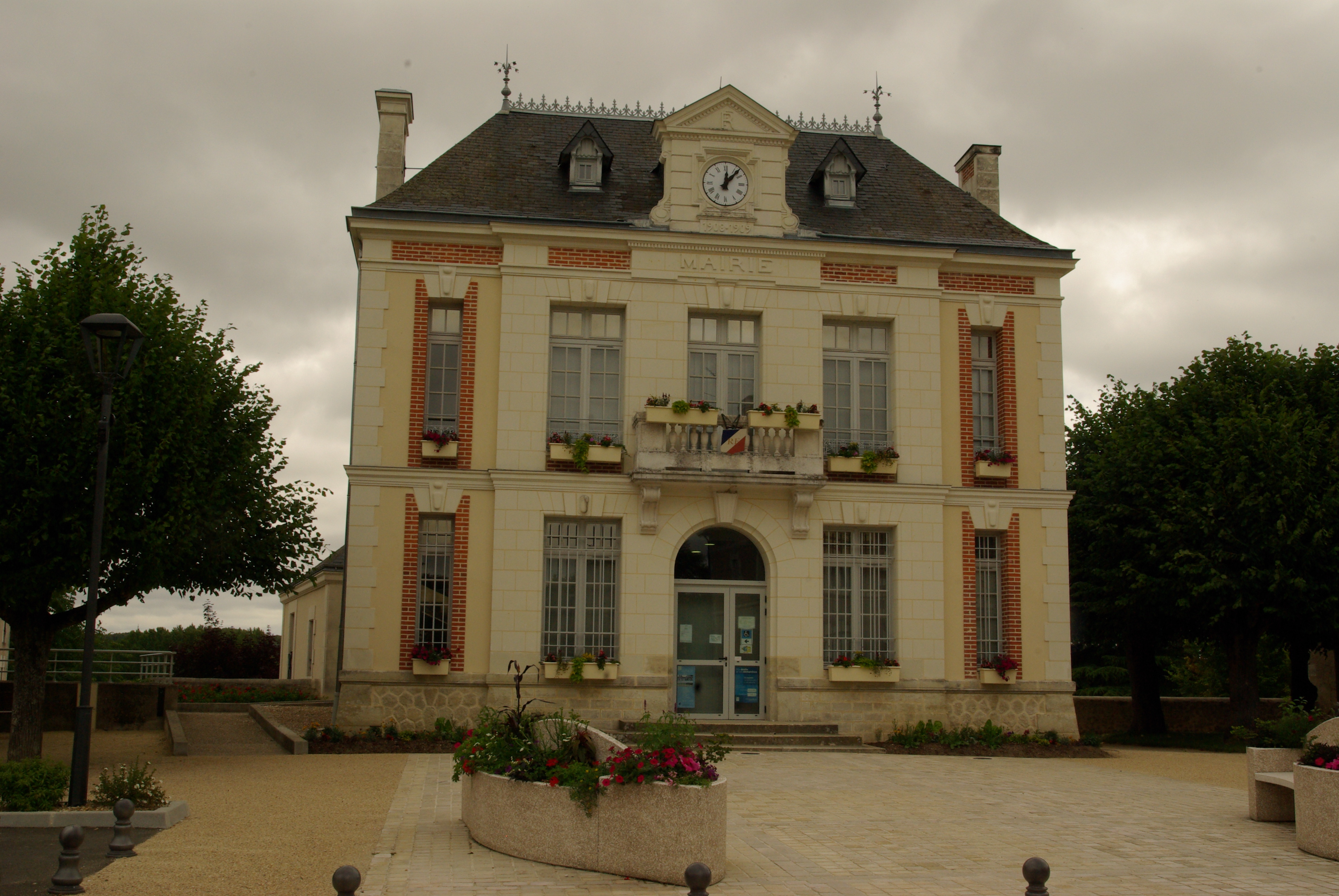
- Town hall
- Location of Chambourg-sur-Indre
- Location within France Location within Centre-Val de Loire
- Coordinates: 47°10′56″N 0°58′05″E
- Country: France
- Region: Centre-Val de Loire
- Department: Indre-et-Loire
- Arrondissement: Loches
- Canton: Loches
- Intercommunality: CC Loches Sud Touraine

Government
  - Mayor (2020–2026): Frédéric Vaillant
- Area^{1}: 28.39 km^{2} (10.96 sq mi)
- Highest elevation: 119 m (390 ft)
- Lowest elevation: 62 m (203 ft)
- Population (2023): 1,265
  - Density: 44.56/km^{2} (115.4/sq mi)
- Time zone: UTC+01:00 (CET)
  - Summer (DST): UTC+02:00 (CEST)
- INSEE/Postal code: 37049 /37310
- ^{1} French Land Register data, which excludes lakes, ponds, glaciers > 1 km^{2} (0.386 sq mi or 247 acres) and river estuaries.

Chambourg-sur-Indre (French pronunciation: [ʃɑ̃buʁ syʁ ɛ̃dʁ], literally Chambourg on Indre) is a commune in the department of Indre-et-Loire in the region of Centre-Val de Loire, France.

Perhaps already occupied in the Neolithic era, the site was colonized at the time of the Roman Empire; witnessed by many traces of an aqueduct, a Roman villa, a Roman road. Hosting a Viguerie (medieval administrative court) and a medieval fief, Chambourg became a commune in 1789, following an exchange of hamlets hitherto undivided with its neighbor Chédigny.

Formed as Chambourg-sur-Indre in 1920, the town is one of the few rural areas of Lochois that as not experienced population decline in the 20th century. Over the last 30 years, agriculture in the community has refocused around large farms specializing in the cultivation of cereals, oil seeds and protein crops. In industry, since 1961, Chambourg-sur-Indre has welcomed a major French company in the field of traffic signs.

Between the Gâtine of Loches plateau, the Loches forest and the Indre valley, Chambourg has in its territory varied wildlife worthy of being partially integrated with multiple national conservation efforts including (ZNIEFF) and (Natura 2000) for the assessment and protection of biodiversity.

== Geography ==
=== Location and surrounding communities ===
The town of Chambourg-sur-Indre is located in the southeast quadrant of the Indre-et-Loire department, in the historical region of Touraine. Chambourg-sur-Indre is located at 31.5 kilometres (19.6 mi) southeast of Tours (prefecture of the Indre-et-Loire department), as the crow flies and 6.2 kilometres (3.9 mi) north of Loches.

=== Geology and topology ===
The main geological formation Chambourg-sur-Indre is Cenomanian sandstone, deposited about 95 million years (Ma) ago by a sea that covered Touraine. Deposits laid on top of this are a yellow Turonian limestone (deposited 90 Ma), then a layer of Senonian chalk (between 89 and 65.5 Ma); the sea receded at the end of this period, which corresponds to the end of Mesozoic era. In the northwest corner of the commune, a different seas deposited the limestone lake in the middle and the end of the Eocene epoch (37 to 34 Ma), characteristic of the small fertile agricultural region of Champeigne tourangelle. The rest of the plateau is irregularly covered with loess (wind blown sediment) from the Quaternary period, forms an infertile soil called "bournais". The valleys of the Indre and its tributaries, which have cut the base of the limestone plateau during alternating glacial and interglacial periods of the Pleistocene, are covered with recent alluvium, giving the soil a hydromorphous tendency, often with a shallow water table. The slopes between the plateau and the valleys are eroded washed silt or gravel deposits and clay from the Turonian and Senonian strata; this type of soil is called "perruche" (parakeet) in the Loire Valley.

The land area of Chambourg-sur-Indre is 28.4 km^{2} (in 2018), the average area of a French commune being 15.8 km^{2}.

The altitude of this area varies between 62 metres (203 ft) and 119 metres (390 ft). The lowest point is on the edge of Indre within the municipal boundary of Azay-sur-Indre and the highest is on the west plateau, bordering Chanceaux-près-Loches and Dolus-le-Sec.

=== Natural landscapes ===
Woods and forests are still present in Chambourg-sur-Indre where they still account for about a fifth of the total area of the municipality. They are found in the east, near Saint-Quentin-sur-Indrois and Ferrière-sur-Beaulieu (limit of Loches National Forest), as in the west, where they form a band from commune headquarters to the municipal boundary with Chanceaux-près-Loches. The broad valley of the Indre offers a landscape of meadows, most of which are flooded during flood periods, bordered by groves of poplars to enhance area once covered in grass. The rest of the municipality, namely non-forested parts of the plateau adjoining the Indre Valley by wooded slopes, dedicated to agriculture, of an average fertility, except for the extreme north-western tip of the town, established in Champeigne "a locality there besides that name", with much more favorable agronomic characteristics.

=== Waterways ===
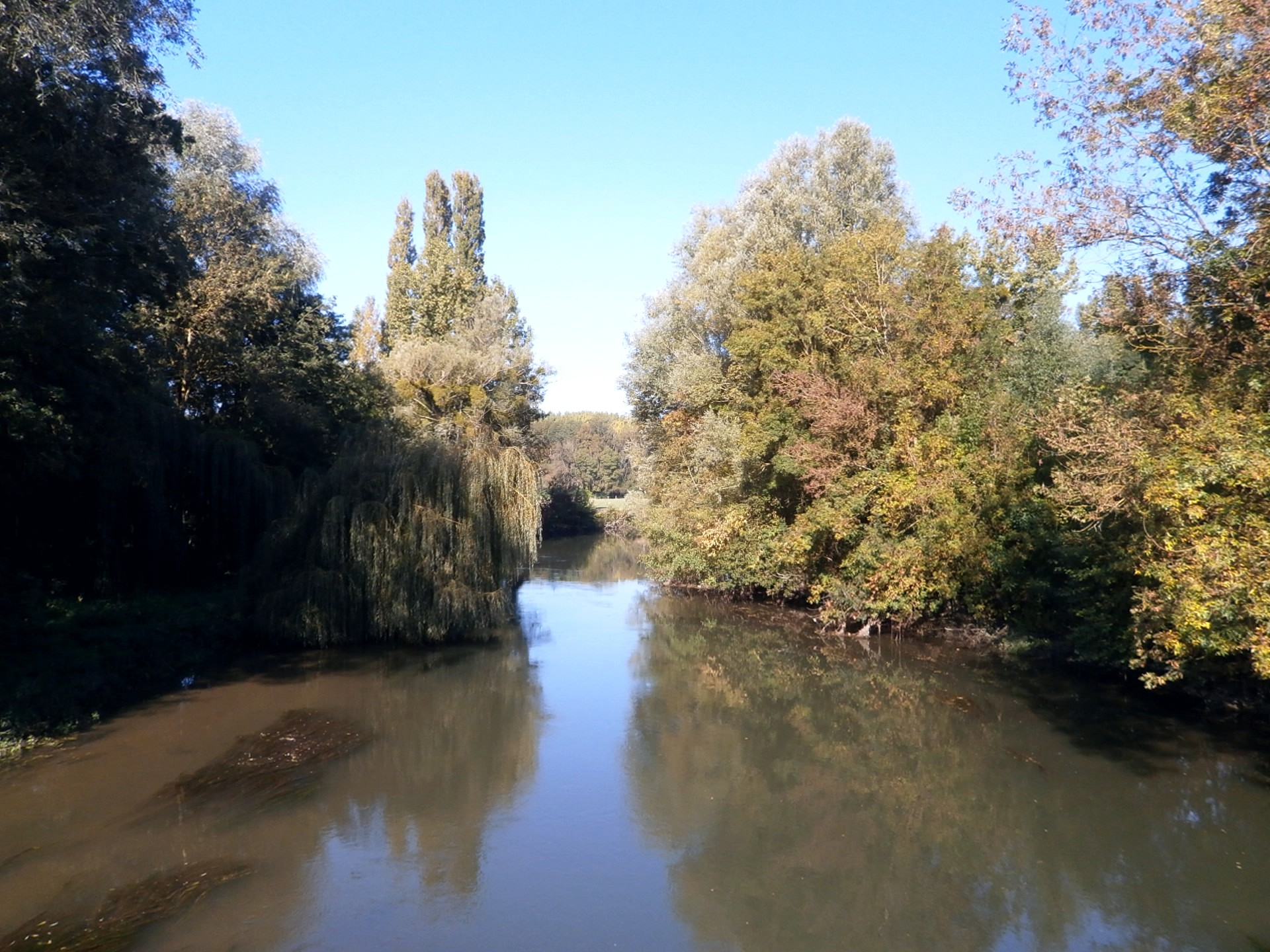
The Indre at Chambourg-sur-Indre.

The municipality of Chambourg-sur-Indre is crossed from south-southeast to north-north-east by the Indre river which cut into the plateau a broad valley about 500 metres (1,600 ft) wide. At the bottom of this valley, and due to its shallow slope, the Indre navigates many bends and oxbow lakes, even forming downstream of the urban core Chambourg-sur-Indre, two separate lakes enclosing an island. Indre is fed with a half-dozen streams originating on the plateau to the left side or in the forest of Loches for the right bank. Their courses are usually perpendicular to that of the Indre, including at their confluence. Floods of the Indre are of the flood plain type, (Note: Flood plain refer to when the level of a river, usually following heavy rainfall, rises slowly until inundation of the flood plain, for a longer or shorter period.) threatening areas of the town built closer to the river.

The Indre is mentioned for the first time by Gregory of Tours in the 6th century under the name fluvium Angerem". This name is often attributed to a change in the Frankish language anger (prairie grass) from the root ang- or 'angr-.

=== Climate ===
The geographical location of Chambourg-sur-Indre gives it a temperate ocean climate; The coast at Rochelle is 200 kilometres (120 mi) away "as the crow flies". This type of climate, subject to prevailing westerly flow over the year is characterized by mild temperatures, the average monthly minimum is never below freezing, even in winter, while in summer it is common to have a heatwave for a few days. No month is truly dry, average monthly rainfall is always greater than 40 millimetres (1.6 in).

=== Communication and transport ===
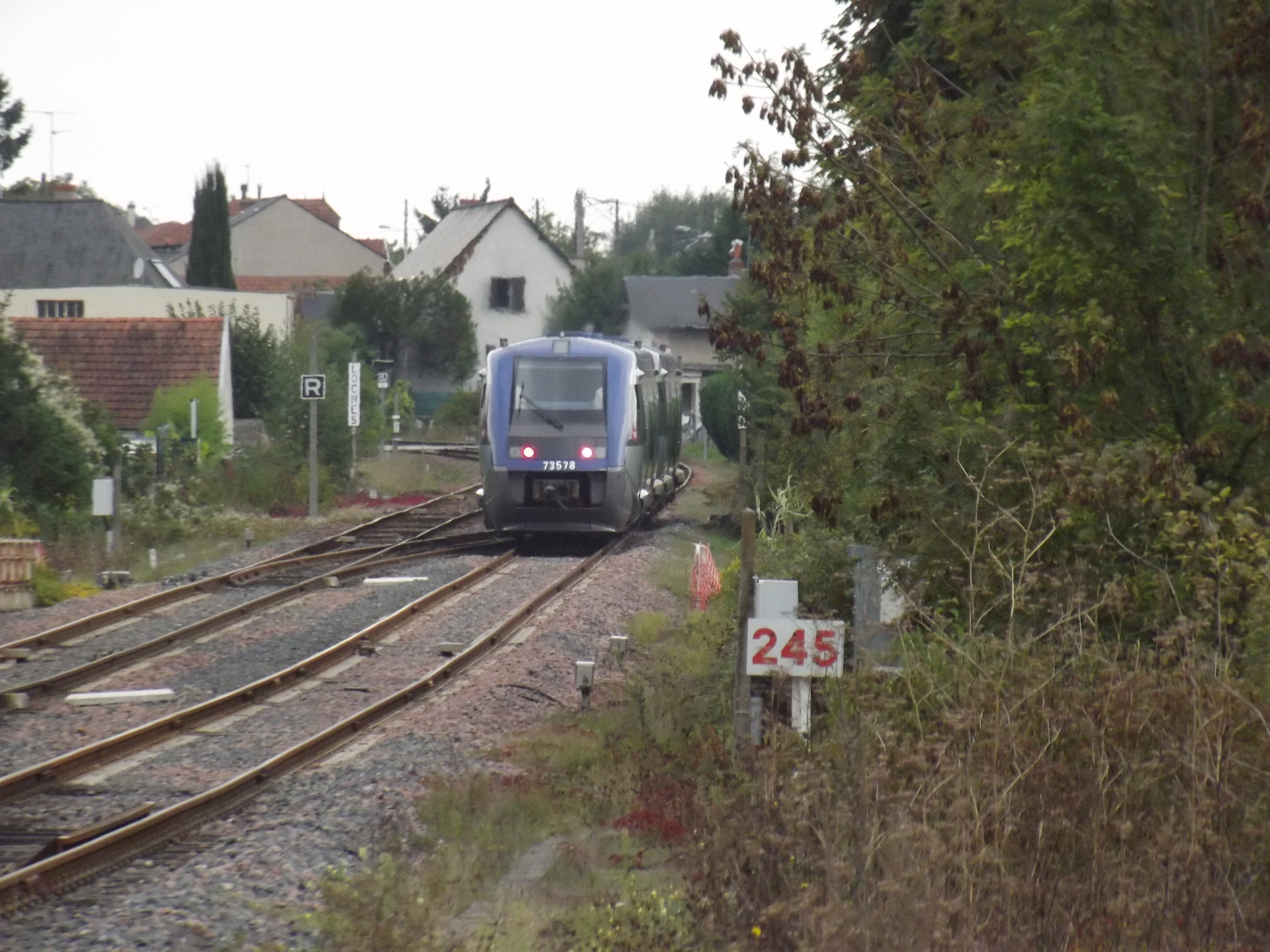
Automatic train X73578 ensuring TER link from Loches to Tours.

==== Air travel ====
A 53 minutes road trip from Chambourg, the Tours Val de Loire Airport in 2014 offered regular services to Ajaccio, Figari, Toulouse, Dublin, London, Marrakesh and Porto; other destinations, seasonal or charter, are available.

==== Rail travel ====
The people of Chambourg can go to Loches and Tours by train, using the TER Centre-Val de Loire line Tours-Loches, accessible by train from the Chambourg train station or by bus, which stops in the center of town according to schedules. Chambourg-sur-Indre offers a parking area for the carpooling, equipped with a charging point for electric vehicles.

==== Roads ====
The main road through Chambourg-sur-Indre is the D943 (formerly N143) that crosses the plateau west of the Indre almost right on the 28 kilometres (17 mi) marker separating Tours from Chambourg-sur-Indre; it then descends into the valley of the Indre to join Loches 12 kilometres (7.5 mi) from Chambourg-sur-Indre; between Cormery and Chambourg-sur-Indre, is joined by D17 after the Indre valley on the left bank and directly serves the center of the town before joining the D943 at the southern end of the town center. It is also possible to go from Loches Chambourg using the D25 along the right bank of the Indre between the Island Thimée (Chambourg) and Corbery (Loches).

== City planning ==
=== City changes ===
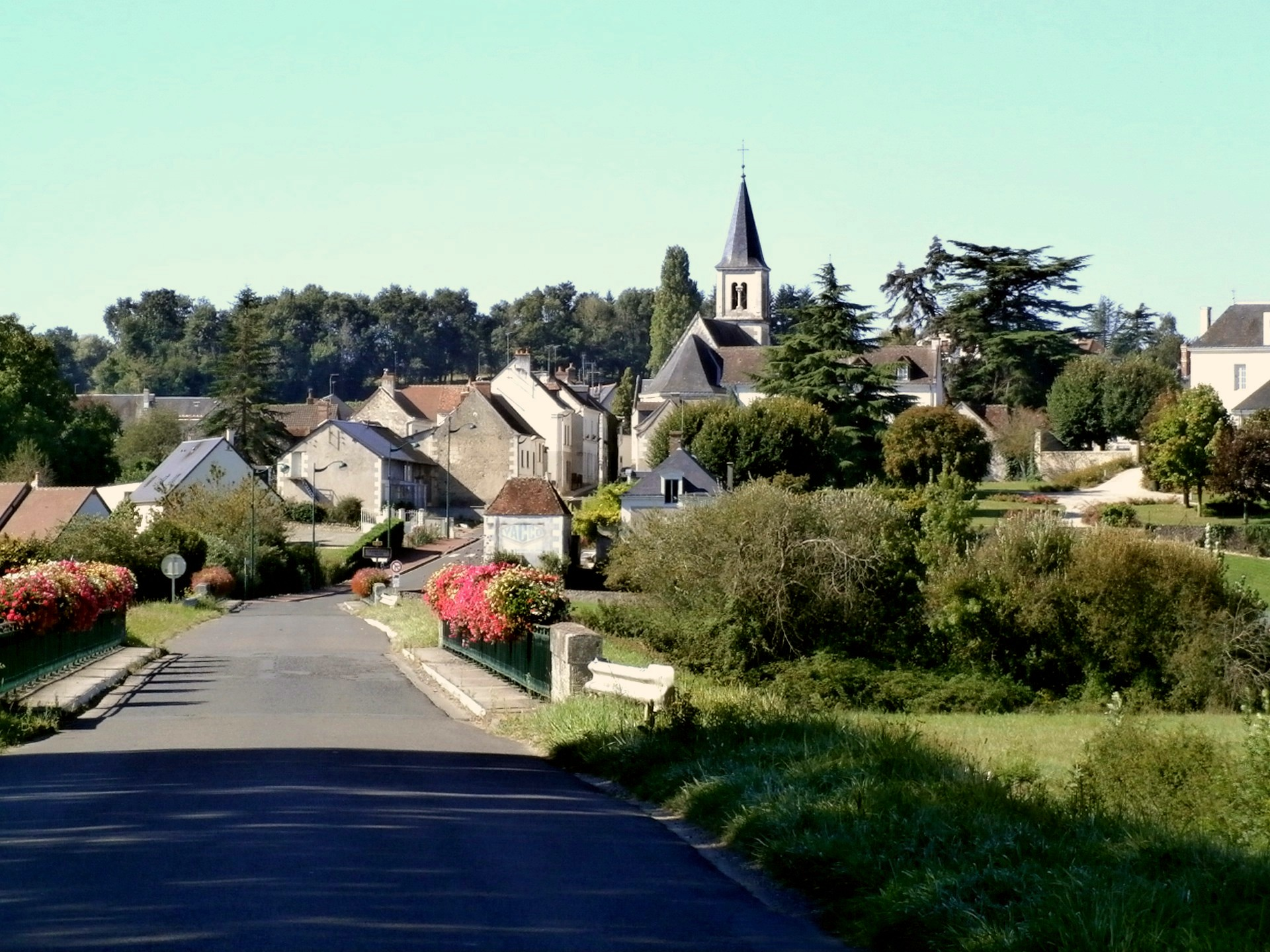
General view of the town.

The urban center of Chambourg-sur-Indre is grouped around the pole formed by the church and the town hall from the intersection of the D94 (north-east south-east) and D17 (northwest southeast). The site overlooks by 10 metres (33 ft) the left side of the Indre Valley flowing northeast, is immune to flooding. The town has expanded since 1980 as subdivisions are built along new roads, west and east of the town in recent projects, being established more directly in the bottom of the valley of the Indre. To the west of the town is business district. Once having crossed the series of three bridges that cross the D94 to the Indre valley towards the northeast and Chédigny we find Thimée Island, an important hamlet also benefiting from new construction, with the town center hanging somehow on the right bank of the Indre.

Several other villages, mostly located at the foot of the hill on the right bank of the Indre, are experiencing the same level of development. Part of the area situated on the plateau on the right bank of the Indre is much less populated, with the exception of "one-road town" built not far from the castle Marray on a promontory surrounded by the valleys of two parallel streams, tributaries of the left bank of the Indre.

=== Housing ===
As of 2020, there were 647 houses in Chambourg-sur-Indre. Of these, 85% were primary residences, 6% were holiday homes, and 9% were vacant. 2.9% of the houses are in apartment buildings. 78% of the primary residences were owned by their occupants. 65% of the residents lived in the same house for more than 10 years. (Note: Logement en 2020, INSEE)

=== Recent and future improvements ===
In 2013, the municipality undertook the burial of electrical networks in many of its streets. On November 24, 2014, a new first response center of firefighters was dedicated.

At its meetings of May and June 2014, the City Council discussed several interesting development projects for urbanism and habitat, such as the construction of a car park and the redevelopment of a Street Chambourg-sur-Indre, preceded by burying electricity and telecommunications networks.

=== Major natural hazards ===
On 28 April 2005, the prefecture of Indre-et-Loire adopted a plan to prevent flooding for all municipalities in the Indre department, which includes Chambourg-sur-Indre; accordingly, the land located in the Chambourg extreme flood hazard zone are unsuitable for. A prefectural order dated 29 April 2011 specifies the nature of natural hazards to which Chambourg-sur-Indre is subject; they are of two types: flooding due to an overflow of the Indre or flooding from storm water runoff. The same document details the decrees of acknowledgment of natural disasters made between 1983 and 2011 for the municipality of Chambourg-sur-Indre, two decrees for floods and mudslides (1983 and 1985), two decrees for landslides following a drought (1993 and 2005) and one decree for floods, mudslides and landslides (1999). This paper also indicates that Chambourg-sur-Indre is located in a low risk earthquake zone: level 2 on a scale of 1–5.

The risk of landslides after drought is due to the successive phases of shrinking and swelling clays could undermine the foundations of buildings. All of the plateau of Chambourg-sur-Indre, on both sides of the Indre, is subject to a "medium" or "strong" rating for this risk, while in the valley of the Indre, this risk is considered "lower" or "a priori", according to the scale defined by the (BRGM).

== Name origin ==
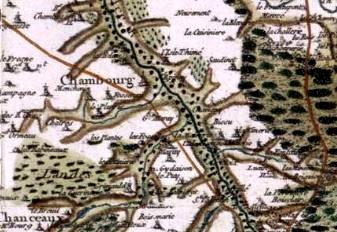
Chambourg-sur-Indre on the Cassini map

The place name Chambourg appears for the first time in the founding charter of the abbey of Cormery from 791 as Condita Cambortensis. In the tenth century, villa Cambort was used, Chamborc in the ecclesiastical register of Tours from 1290 or Chambourt in a cartulary of chartreuse du Liget in 1304.

As shown in the older forms, it is kind Gallic name Cambo-ritu, based on two Celtic roots cambo- (curve, bend) and rito, ritu (ford), hence the overall sense of "stepping into the curve" or "ford of the meander". The etymology continued to change to, among others, Château de Chambord or Chambors (Oise). Indeed, the element ritu- preceded by -o-, has led to a regular termination -or- written variously as -ort (for example Niort, Jort), -ors or -ord. Chambort was reinterpreted Cham-bourg (Cham-town) by analogy with the term bourg (village) in the Middle Ages.
The current spelling appears in the Cassini map; the final name of the town, Chambourg-sur-Indre was fixed by the order of 23 August 1920, the complementary suffix 'sur-Indre' avoiding possible confusion elsewhere with the same name.

The names l'Île Thimée (Thimée Island) and l'Île Auger (Auger Island) refers to a time when these place names, were in the area of the Indre; this is no longer the case in modern times. According to written sources, both spellings "isle" (old spelling) or "île" (modern spelling) are used indiscriminately. In this article, the modern spelling is used.

== History ==
=== Prehistory and early history ===
The oldest traces of human presence on the site Chambourg-sur-Indre manifest themselves in the form of a racloir (scraper), a typical tool of Mousterian, found by chance during a survey of soil in the forest of Loches; Neolithic tools were also found. We presume the existence of a Neolithic settlement at a place called "Chatres". The possible origin of the place name in the Gallo-Roman CASTRU (from the Latin castrum "fortified camp") and the layout "limited to a promontory east through the valley of the Indre and north and south by the courts of two of its tributaries streams" (translated) suggest the existence of a promontory fort; however, no excavation has yet verified the validity of this hypothesis.

=== Antiquity ===
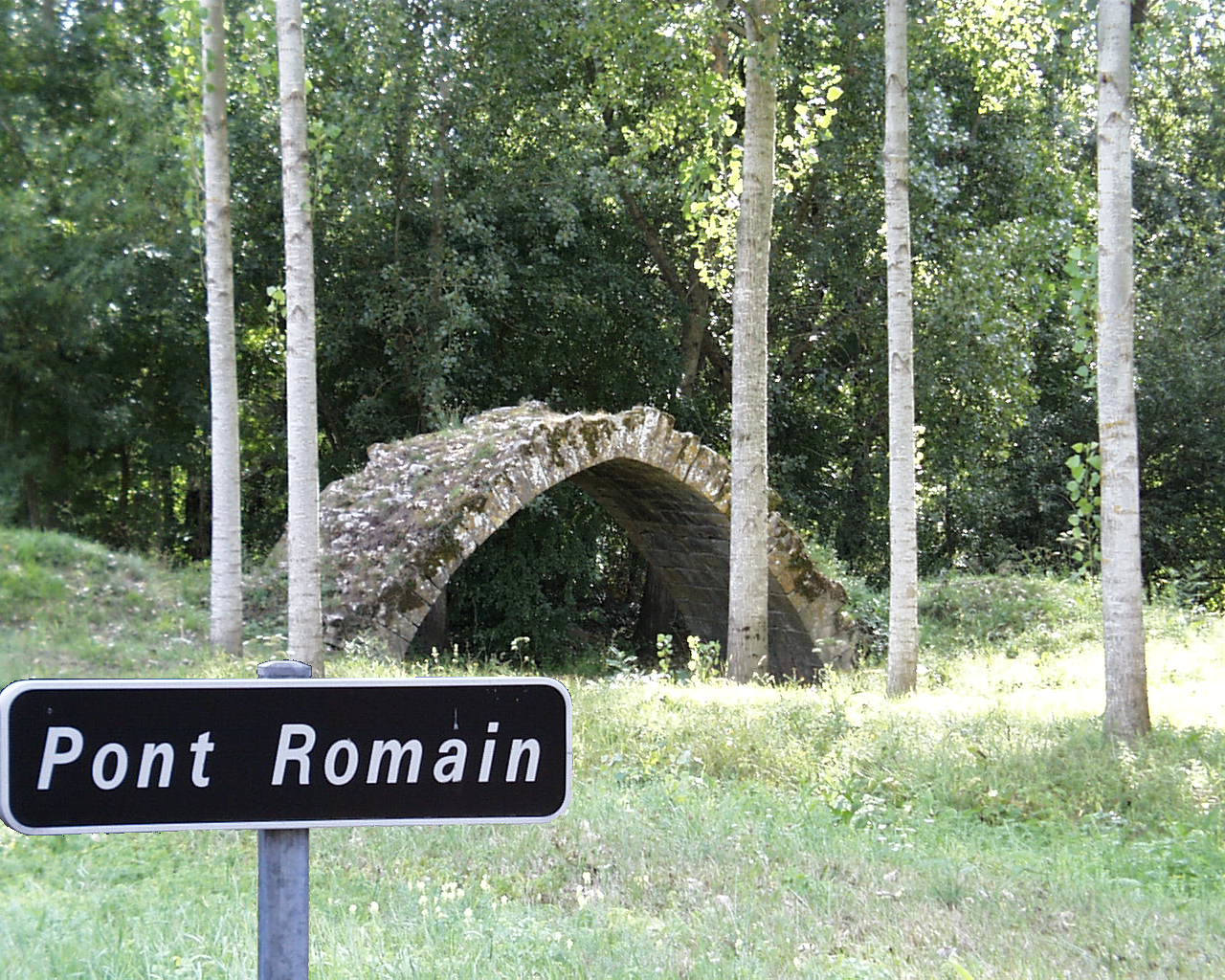
Pseudo-Roman Bridge at Auger Island. (Note: This image is a photo-editing: the sign is actually farther from the bridge.)

The Gallo-Roman site at Cornillé, on the left bank of the Indre 3.5 kilometres (2.2 mi) upstream of the town contains reticulated walls (opus reticulatum) that were still visible at the beginning of the nineteenth century, and a hypocaust (underfloor heating) and the remains of an aqueduct; in 2014 the only remaining portions of walls in basements. This site was perhaps that of a mansio (way station). On the right bank of the Indre, between Corbery (village of Loches) and Auger Island on Chambourg-sur-Indre, D25 follows almost exactly an ancient road which continued in antiquity to Azay-sur-Indre beyond the Thimée Island without leaving the right bank of the Indre. Coins bearing the image of the emperors Nero, who reigned from 54 to 68, and Septimius Severus (193–211) were discovered in the town, on the site of a domus There is a medieval bridge on Auger Island nicknamed "Roman bridge" on many documents (maps [Institut géographique national|National Geographic Institute (IGN)] ] for example) and on the signs.

=== Middle ages ===
Chambourg was promoted to the rank of Viguerie in the ninth century; while these honors were often temporary, Chambourg Viguerie, whose existence is supported for more than a century and a half, was an exception, or at least a rarity. At the end of the tenth century early eleventh century, the Count of Anjou and the house of Blois fought over Touraine, snatching and taking each other's territories. No document seems to mention such problems for Chambourg. In the Middle Ages, Chambourg was a fief, subordinate to Castle Bray, which was named at that time, Reignac-sur-Indre in the thirteenth to fifteenth centuries.

=== From modern day to the Empire ===
In the seventeenth century, Chambourg was one of eighteen priories subject to the Benedictine Abbey of Cormery. However, the monks of the Beaulieu-lès-Loches Abbey (also Benedictine) collected taxes on

fisheries in Indre, Chambourg to Azay-le-Brûlé (today Azay-sur-Indre) in the amount of 60 pounds.

Also, in the seventeenth century, several titled aristocrats arrived in the area of Chambourg. The forest of Loches was considered a rich source of food for it contains game, chestnuts, honey, the firewood and lumber that provides for heating and buioling, and any offense committed against the forest was severely punished; between 1750 and 1790, several residents of the Auger Island and other villages in Chambourg were arrested for illegal logging of 60 oaks in the massive forest of Loches, and of other timber theft.

Until the French Revolution, some hamlets close to the boundary between the parishes of St. Martin and St. Chambourg Michel Chédigny (the parish gathering the inhabitants of the left bank of the Indrois), which hamlets were called "turning and twisting" (translated), that is to say, they were subject to one or the other parish, alternating annually, had at its center, a complex system of financial compensation between the parishes concerned. This ended with the creation of the commune on December 14, 1789 and the delimitation of their territories; these hamlets were then attached permanently to Chambourg, or Chédigny.

=== Modern day ===
The creation of the railway line connecting Tours Châteauroux, opened between Joué-lès-Tours and Loches in 1879 with the creation of a stop in Chambourg in 1879 can be considered a milestone for the town; at the time when the rural exodus began to be felt in the villages, it limited the impact to Chambourg allowing the inhabitants of the town to continue to live there, or even to settle in town while working Tours, but especially Loches. This demographic dynamic was reinforced by the installation at the beginning of the 20th century, businesses related to agriculture, mills on the Indre and grain storage silos, the latter taking advantage of the proximity of rail service. These companies gradually disappeared in the second half of the 20th century but were replaced by others, such as a large road sign factory located in Chambourg since 1961 which has more than one hundred employees.

Forty-eight Chambourgeois died in combat during World War I, or about one out of 20.

On June 19, 1940, when German troops were reported in the eastern department, the French army was trying to slow their advance by blowing up the bridges over the Indre, including Chambourg. Between June 22, 1940 and 28 February 1943, the demarcation line ran north–south in the town of Le Château-le-Sec, bordering Chambourg-sur-Indre on the west: Chambourg-sur-Indre was in zone libre (unoccupied territory), but only a few kilometers from the line; the municipality was rejoined on 28 February 1943 to the prefecture of Indre. As early as June 1940, the prefect of Indre replaced the elected mayor by a special delegation of four members who served until October 1944. In the last decade of August 1944, German troops gradually withdrew to the north and east of the department after Loches was recaptured they had to leave for a few days. Their headquarters was temporarily set up in St. Valentin, a hamlet of Chambourg near the municipal boundary with Loches.

== Policy and administration ==
=== Administration ===
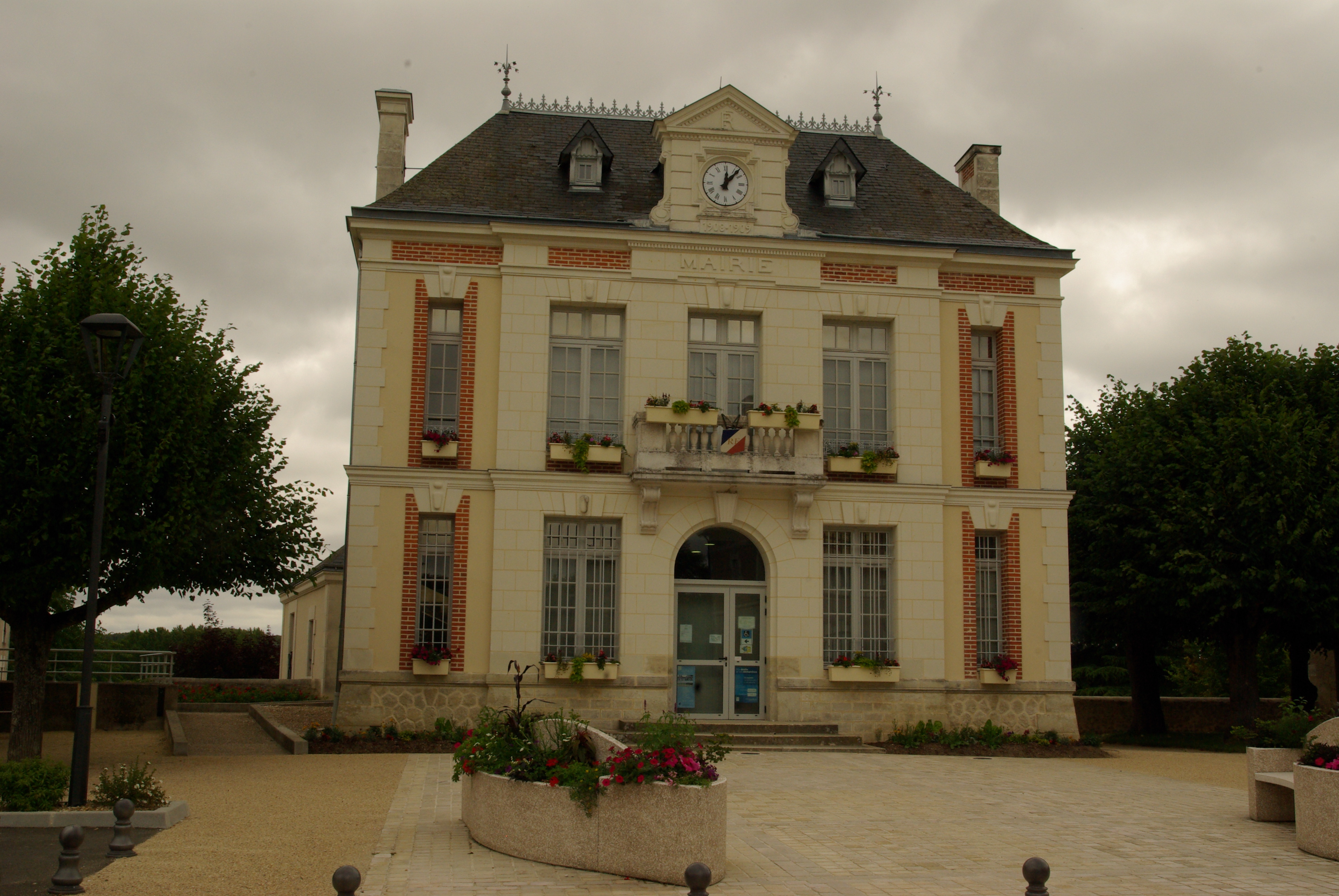
City Hall

Chambourg-sur-Indre is part of Canton of Loches, which includes twenty towns around Loches, the chief town of the district. It is attached to the arrondissements (district) of Loches and the third electoral district of the Indre-et-Loire, whose MP is Marisol Touraine, Socialist Party since 2012.

=== Political tendencies and results ===
The results of the last two presidential elections show an electorate anchored to the left, in a town that has elected a mayor belonging to the French Communist Party between 1995 and 2014; the results of regional elections and the last two parliamentary elections confirm this trend. The incumbent mayor did not seek a fifth term in municipal elections in 2014 which the voting, similar to the municipal elections in 2008, does not bring out a decisive political orientation. The European election results do not lend themselves to analysis with a relatively low participation and voting in one round which promotes the dispersion of votes but for the first time, the electorate middle class nominated National Front candidates at the top of their votes. (Note: These remarks are not the result of a statistical analysis of the data presented. They are only indicative.)

==== Latest presidential elections ====
In the second round of the presidential elections of 2007, Nicolas Sarkozy, Union for a Popular Movement was elected, obtaining 48.33% of the vote Segolene Royal, Socialist Party, 51.67% of the vote; turnout was 86.56%. In the second round of the presidential elections of 2012, François Hollande, Socialist Party was elected, receiving 52.57% of the vote Nicolas Sarkozy, Union for a Popular Movement, 47.43% of the vote; turnout was 82.57%.

==== Latest municipal elections ====
The population at the last census being between 500 and 1499 inhabitants, the number of council members is 15. In the municipal elections of 2008, 15 councilors were elected in the first round; turnout was 66.13%. In the municipal elections of 2014, 15 councilors were elected in the first round, with a participation rate of 56.85%; the only list presented obtained three seats on the community council.

=== List of mayors ===
List of Mayors
From	To	Name	Party	Notes
1802	1826	Pierre Cellier		
1826	1834	Perfus		
1835	1843	Pierre Cellier		
1843	Aug 1847	Descombes		
Aug 1847	Dec 1847	Robellandes		(Note: Mayor Robellandes dies in office.)
Jan 1848	Nov 1848	Douard		(Note: Deputy Mayor Douard served as acting mayor after the death of Mr. Mayor Robellandes.)
Nov 1848	Dec 1869	Charles Deplais		
Jan 1870	Aug 1870	Simon Dubois		
Sep 1870	Sep 1876	Louis Cellier		
Oct 1876	Apr 1883	Lucien Monnessier		(Note: Mayor Lucien Monnessier died while in office.)
Apr 1883	Apr 1883	Jean Arrault		(Note: Deputy Mayor Jean Arrault served as acting mayor after the death of Mayor Lucien Monnessier.)
May 1883	Dec 1886	Étienne Gripouilleau		(Note: Mayor Étienne Gripouilleau died while in office.)
Dec 1886	Dec 1886	Jean Arrault		(Note: Deputy Mayor Jean Arrault acted as mayor after the death of Mayor Étienne Gripouilleau.)
Jan 1887	Jan 1887	Louis Girard		(Note: Deputy Mayor Louis Girard acted as mayor after the death of Mayor Étienne Gripouilleau.)
Feb 1887	Aug 1899	Louis Crépin		
Aug 1899	May 1904	Joseph Perreau		
May 1904	May 1908	Couchelay Deroche		
Jun 1908	Apr 1933	Émile Douard		(Note: Mayor Emile Douard died while in office.)
May 1933	Jun 1933	Léon Marcadier		(Note: Deputy Mayor Leon Marcadier was acting mayor after the death of Mayor Emile Douard.)
May 1933	Aug 1940	Léon Marcadier		
Aug 1940	Oct 1944	no mayor		a special delegation held the office
Oct 1944	1952 ?	Marcel Viraud		
Mar 1995	Mar 2014	Guy Moreau	PCF	
29 Mar 2014	2020	Laurent Couraud		
2020	incumbent	Frédéric Vaillant		

=== Judicial and administrative bodies ===
Until late 2009, the people of Chambourg-sur-Indre were within the jurisdiction of the Loches District Court. Since the judicial redistricting on 1 January 2010, Chambourg-sur-Indre was placed in the jurisdiction of the District Court of Tours, except for which is responsible for the entire department. All jurisdictions in Chambourg-sur-Indre are thus grouped in Tours, with the exception of administrative court based in Orléans.

The town is located in the area of gendarmerie of proximity brigade of Loches.

=== Intercommunal relations ===
Chambourg-sur-Indre is part of Association for Development of Loches Communes since its inception on December 31, 1995. which includes twenty municipalities with a population of 21,550 of which 6455 inhabit Loches as of 2011.

The inter-community energy union of Indre-et-Loire (SIEIL) provides control and coordination of all dealers operating in the Indre-et-Loire in the field of distribution of gas and electricity; it also focuses on strengthening electricity resourcing and distribution. Founded in 1937, it has gradually evolved in the context of opening energy markets to competition. By prefectural decree dated April 23, 2008, all municipalities in Indre-et-Loire, Tours excepted, each adhere to SIEIL.

A single-purpose intercommunal union (SIVU), to which Chambourg-sur-Indre belongs, as well as 48 other municipalities in the Lochois, supports the transport of high school students between their respective municipalities and public and private secondary schools, open in the scope of this SIVU skills. It is the municipal association of school transport Lochois headquartered at Ferrière-sur-Beaulieu and operates in agreement with a professional carrier.

=== Environmental policy ===
Communauté de communes Loches Développement (Organization of Communes of Loches for Development) administers a common environmental policy throughout its territory.

==== Water and sanitation ====
Since 1 January 2012, the Régie eau potable et assainissement (Department of drinking water and sanitation) supports the organization of the drinking water distribution and maintenance of sewer systems. On December 31, 2012, the drinking water was supplied to 634 subscribers. This water is taken from three wells exploiting the water Seno-Turonian in the area of the municipality of Reignac-sur-Indre. After removal of iron and UV treatment, the water is distributed or sent to a storage tank in Chambourg-sur-Indre.

For 265 subscribers in Chambourg-sur-Indre (as of December 31, 2012), wastewater treatment is provided by:

- A wastewater treatment plant using artificial wetland, with a capacity of 600 EH (population equivalent) for the town;
- Two treatment plants (STEP) equipped with a reed bed filter device; with a capacity of 200 and 110 EH, they respectively serve the hamlets of Thimée Island and Upper Luain;
- A septic tank (FSTE) with a sand filter with a capacity of 40 EH for tiny Luain.

==== Household waste ====
There is a weekly garbage collection and household waste at each home. Glass containers and newspapers-magazines are located on two sites in the municipality. Collection of bulky items is performed once a year door-to-door. The people of Chambourg-sur-Indre, who are likely to have a garden, can also get bins for composting their garden waste. Finally, they have access to waste disposal of Chanceaux-près-Loches or Tauxigny, at a distance, respectively, of 6.5 kilometres (4.0 mi) and 12 kilometres (7.5 mi).

=== Local finance ===
The table below shows some elements of the local finances of Chambourg-sur-Indre, over a period of nine years:

Accounts of the municipality of Chambourg-sur-Indre in 2005–2013 Results expressed in €/capita. Average is of communes with 500–2000 inhabitants belonging to a tax exempt group.
Years	Accounting income		Requirement or capacity of financing of investments		Self Financing Capacity (CAF)	
Years	Chambourg	Average	Chambourg	Average	Chambourg	Average
2005	604	140	398	10	152	142
2006	318	148	554	5	133	151
2007	160	148	105	9	160	152
2008	123	147	255	10	123	151
2009	120	142	108	9	124	147
2010	94	143	29	7	107	150
2011	108	160	22	0	121	168
2012	148	160	12	6	161	168
2013	101	148	131	13	114	156

Some general trends, always comparing Chambourg-sur-Indre with the average of its group (municipalities with 500–2000 inhabitants belonging to a tax-group), are released for consideration by these data.

The year 2006 is the only year among those observed where Chambourg-sur-Indre showed a negative accounting income; (Note: The accounting profit is the difference between operating income and expenses.) all other years have seen a positive result even if, since 2008, it is even very slightly below average. The change in the municipalities ability to finance investment shows no clear trend or issues with sustainability. (Note: The need or ability to finance investments is the difference between resources and investment projects; if resources exceed the cost of projects, there is excess financing capacity; higher cost of projects indicates a need for funding.) Cash flow, (Note: The "cash flow" is the surplus from operations; This allows the use of surplus to make debt repayments. The surplus (cash flow – debt repayments) in addition to investment income (grants, subsidies, plus capital gains) is used to fund capital expenditures. This amount represents the funding available to the commune) like the accounting profit was less than the average of the comparable group since 2008.

== Population and society ==
=== Demographics ===
Historical population

Year	Pop.	±% p.a.
1793	689	—
1800	804	+2.23%
1806	861	+1.15%
1821	853	−0.06%
1831	969	+1.28%
1836	966	−0.06%
1841	1,011	+0.91%
1846	1,049	+0.74%
1851	1,069	+0.38%
1856	1,075	+0.11%
1861	1,056	−0.36%
1866	1,034	−0.42%
1872	990	−0.72%
1876	1,046	+1.39%
1881	1,034	−0.23%
1886	1,046	+0.23%
1891	1,006	−0.78%
1896	1,015	+0.18%
1901	1,027	+0.24%

Year	Pop.	±% p.a.
1906	947	−1.61%
1911	945	−0.04%
1921	934	−0.12%
1926	881	−1.16%
1931	890	+0.20%
1936	866	−0.55%
1946	851	−0.17%
1954	881	+0.43%
1962	925	+0.61%
1968	883	−0.77%
1975	779	−1.77%
1982	857	+1.37%
1990	1,080	+2.93%
1999	1,194	+1.12%
2007	1,283	+0.90%
2012	1,344	+0.93%
2017	1,291	−0.80%
2023	1,265	−0.34%

Source: EHESS and INSEE

The people of Chambourg-sur-Indre are called Chambourgeois in French.

In 1687, the parish registers indicated that Chambourg had 187 feu fiscal (tax allocation units), then 208 units in 1789, the last known value before the first census in population.

In contrast to many rural communities, Chambourg-sur-Indre has not experienced a mass exodus during the 20th century; its population has nearly doubled since the French Revolution and increased by 65% between 1975 and 2009, an average gain of 15 inhabitants per year over this period.

=== Education ===
The town of Chambourg-sur-Indre is part of Orléans-Tours School District. This district is part of the Zone B for its school vacation calendar.

In 2014, the town has, in the Jean Moulin school group, a pre-school and an elementary school with 5 classes and 109 students for the 2013–2014 school year; secondary schools are close to Loches, with two colleges, one public, the other private, and three high schools, two of which are general education schools, one public and one private, and one technical high school.

School children in pre-school and elementary school have a cafeteria in Chambourg-sur-Indre. High school students and students enrolled in Loches have access to transportation allowing them to go to their secondary schools.

Institutions of higher education are located in Tours or in the immediate periphery. Among them, the François Rabelais University offers, in école polytechnique de l'université de Tours and two polytechnic institutes having on forty research laboratories, seven departments for teaching and research; the Graduate School of Business Management of Tours-Poitiers offers at its two sites training baccalaureate+3 or baccalaureate+5; the Brassart school of Tours specializes in graphic arts. In agriculture, the Agricultural High School of Tour Fondettes prepares students to graduate with a senior technician certificate (BTS, Bac + 2).

=== Cultural events and festivities ===
Every year in Chambourg-sur-Indre, on the third Sunday of July, the traditional festival "Chambourg beside the Water" is celebrated with dining, entertainment, concerts and fireworks. The event held in 2013 its forty-ninth birthday.

=== Cultural facilities, social and sporting ===
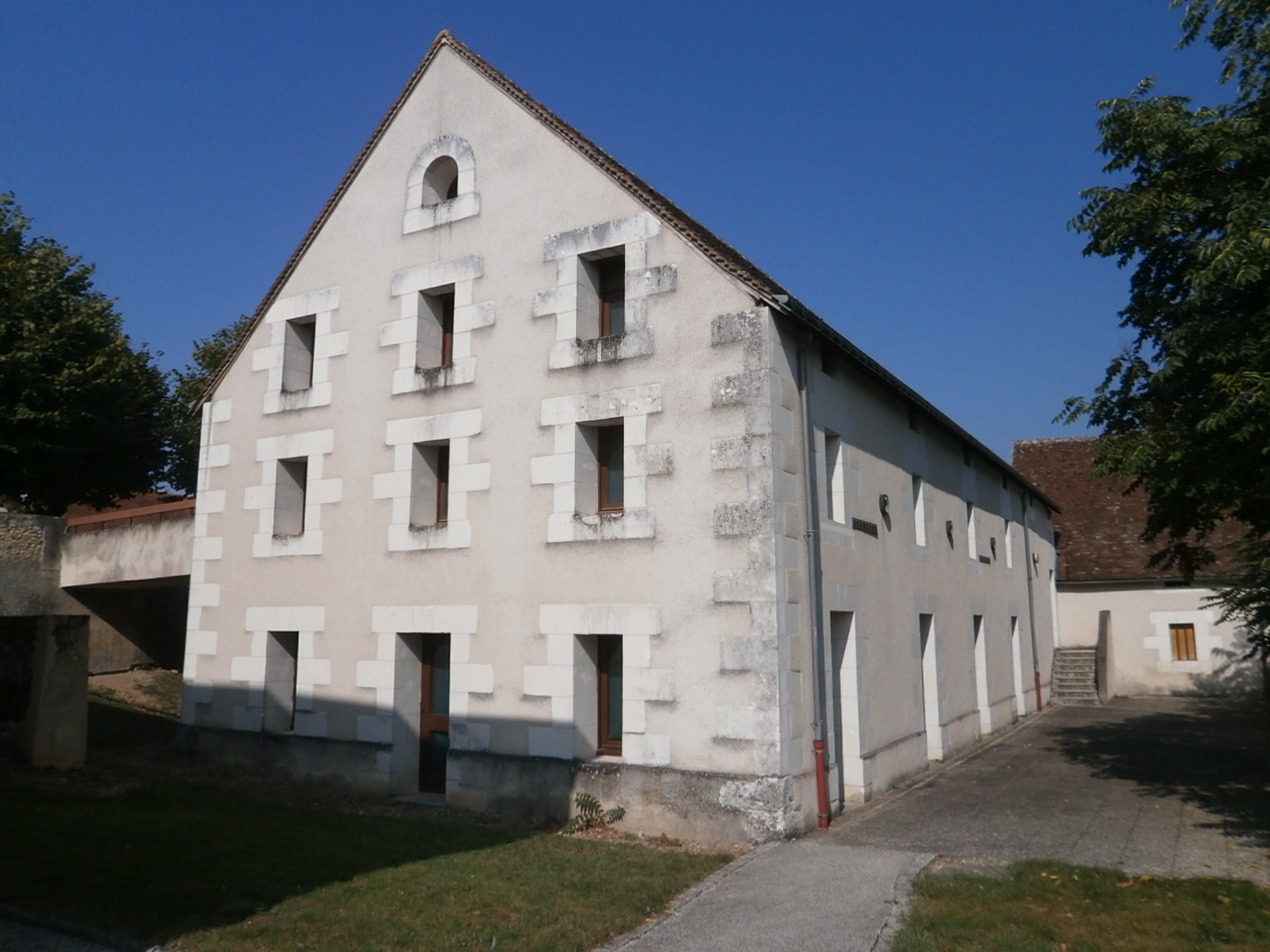
Multipurpose Room of the Tuileries.

A multipurpose room is available in the town, located in a former tile manufactory constructed in 1862. Under the auspices of the General Council of Indre-et-Loire, within the network of the "Department Libraries and Books of Touraine" Chambourg-sur-Indre provides its residents a library with a digital public space.

A recreation area kitchen, a sports field, a tennis court and a bowling green can also be used in Chambourg-sur-Indre.

=== Associations ===
Twenty-five associations are available in the town of Chambourg-sur-Indre, seventeen in the field of cultural action, four in the area of social action and five in sport.

=== Health and emergency services ===
There is a medical office in Chambourg-sur-Indre; it provides the services of a general practitioner, a physiotherapist and a nurse. The nearest hospital is the hospital Rives de Loches Indre.

The closest fire and rescue center is in Chambourg-sur-Indre.

=== Media ===
The regional newspaper La Nouvelle République du Centre-Ouest in its Indre-et-Loire, Touraine East edition devotes a few pages to the news of the Township of Loches. La Renaissance lochoise, l'hebdomadaire de la Touraine du Sud is a weekly local information sheet on townships in southern Touraine.

In the field of audiovisual media, both television channels of digital terrestrial television are available to all residents of Chambourg-sur-Indre and relay local information on France 3 Centre and fr:TV Tours Val de Loire. Among the numerous radio stations available include fr:France Bleu Touraine and Graffic, based in Loches, is especially dedicated to the music and local information in an area from Tours to Poitiers and Châteauroux.

=== Telecommunications ===
In 2014, the entire fixed network deployed in Chambourg-sur-Indre gives access to high speed internet via G.992.5 (ADSL 2+).

== Economy ==
The table below shows the number of companies operating in Chambourg-sur-Indre according to their industry:

Structure of the economy of Chambourg-sur-Indre (37) on 31 December 2015
	Number of institutions involved
TOTAL	97
Agriculture	13
Industry	8
Construction	13
Trade, transport and other services	53
Public administration, education, health, and social action	10

Of the 97 companies listed in Chambourg-sur-Indre on December 31, 2015, 87 had no employees, 8 had between 1 and 9 employees, 1 has a staff of between 10 and 19 employees, and 1 has more than 50 employees; the latter alone accounts for 95 of 135 jobs available in the town. In 2018, 8 companies were created Chambourg-sur-Indre.

=== Businesses and shops ===
==== Agriculture ====
The table below shows the main characteristics of farms surrounding Chambourg-sur-Indre, observed over a period of 22 years:

Changes in agriculture in Chambourg-sur-Indre (37) between 1988 and 2010
	1988	2000	2010
Number of farms	37	19	13
Equivalent annual work units	35	14	10
Useful Agricultural Area (UAA) (ha)	1,477	1,173	1,105
Livestock (heads)	479	188	34
Arable land (ha)	1,311	1,149	1,098
Average size of a farm (ha)	39.9	61.7	85.0

==== Industry ====
The company Sécurité et Signalisation Nouvelle (New Safety and Signals) (SES), a subsidiary of Colas Group after its restructuring in 2011. It specializes in road signs (panel manufacturing and light frames), employing on its site in Chambourg in late 2013, a hundred people. The company, founded in 1957, moved to Chambourg-sur-Indre in 1961 on the site of an old shoe factory.

==== Tourist trade ====
On January 1, 2020, the commune of Chambourg-sur-Indre had no hotel or camping on its territory. In 2014, the proposed Chambourg-sur-Indre tourist accommodations are spread over four bed and breakfasts and (or) home stays.

=== Revenue and taxation ===
In 2011, the taxable income by household in France was 32642 Euro, placing Chambourg-sur-Indre in 11,319 rank among 31,886 communities with more than 49 households in mainland France.

Indicators of income tax from Chambourg-sur-Indre and throughout the Indre-et-Loire in 2017 were below average:

Tax income and taxable homes in Chambourg-sur-Indre
	Chambourg	Indre-et-Loire
Median net income per household (in €)	21,030	21,100
Share of taxable households taxed across all taxable households (in %)	-	50.8

=== Jobs ===
The two tables below show the key figures of employment for Chambourg-sur-Indre, and how they have changed over the last ten years:

Makeup of the workforce of Chambourg-sur-Indre
	Chambourg 2017	Chambourg 2007
Population 15 to 64 years	808	820
Active Job Seekers (%)	74.0	75.8
of which:
Active employment (%)	66.7	71.2
Unemployed (%)	7.2	4.6

Employment trends in Chambourg-sur-Indre
	Chambourg 2017	Chambourg 2007
Number of jobs in the area	195	245
Concentration indicator of employment	35.6	41.6

Over ten years, unemployment has risen sharply, and the number of jobs in the area has decreased.

In 2017, active job seekers living in Chambourg-sur-Indre worked mainly outside the commune (85.7%). There are only 14.3% working in the commune.

== Local culture and heritage ==
=== Places and monuments ===
The gothic bridge of Auger Island, built in the 15th century, has been declared a monument historique (historical monument), registered since October 24, 1927. This bridge connected the two banks of the Indre near an ancient ford which is assumed to be Roman and has a, perhaps unfair, nickname of "Roman bridge" and is even mentioned as such in various print and on signs. The Napoleonic map reports this bridge as the 'Old Bridge', without reference to its date of construction. There now remains only two arches and four bases.

The church of Chambourg-sur-Indre is one of 3,700 religious buildings in France dedicated to St. Martin. Built in the 11th or 12th century, it underwent a major restoration around 1870, but the Romanesque door that opens into the south side of the nave was not altered.

The Grand Marray was the site of a villa mentioned in the cartulary of Cormery in 861 and built in the dependent fief of Reignac-sur-Indre, at the time a property of the family Menou which also owned the castle Genillé until the French Revolution. A château was built in the 19th century.

The Chavigny mansion, in the 17th century belonged to a Marshal General of the King's camps and armies. King Louis XI sometimes stayed there. (Note: This information, which cannot be confirmed from any source, appears to be a common belief of the area.) The oldest part of this house, dating from the 15th century, is flanked by a rectangular turret.

Places and monuments of Chambourg-sur-Indre.

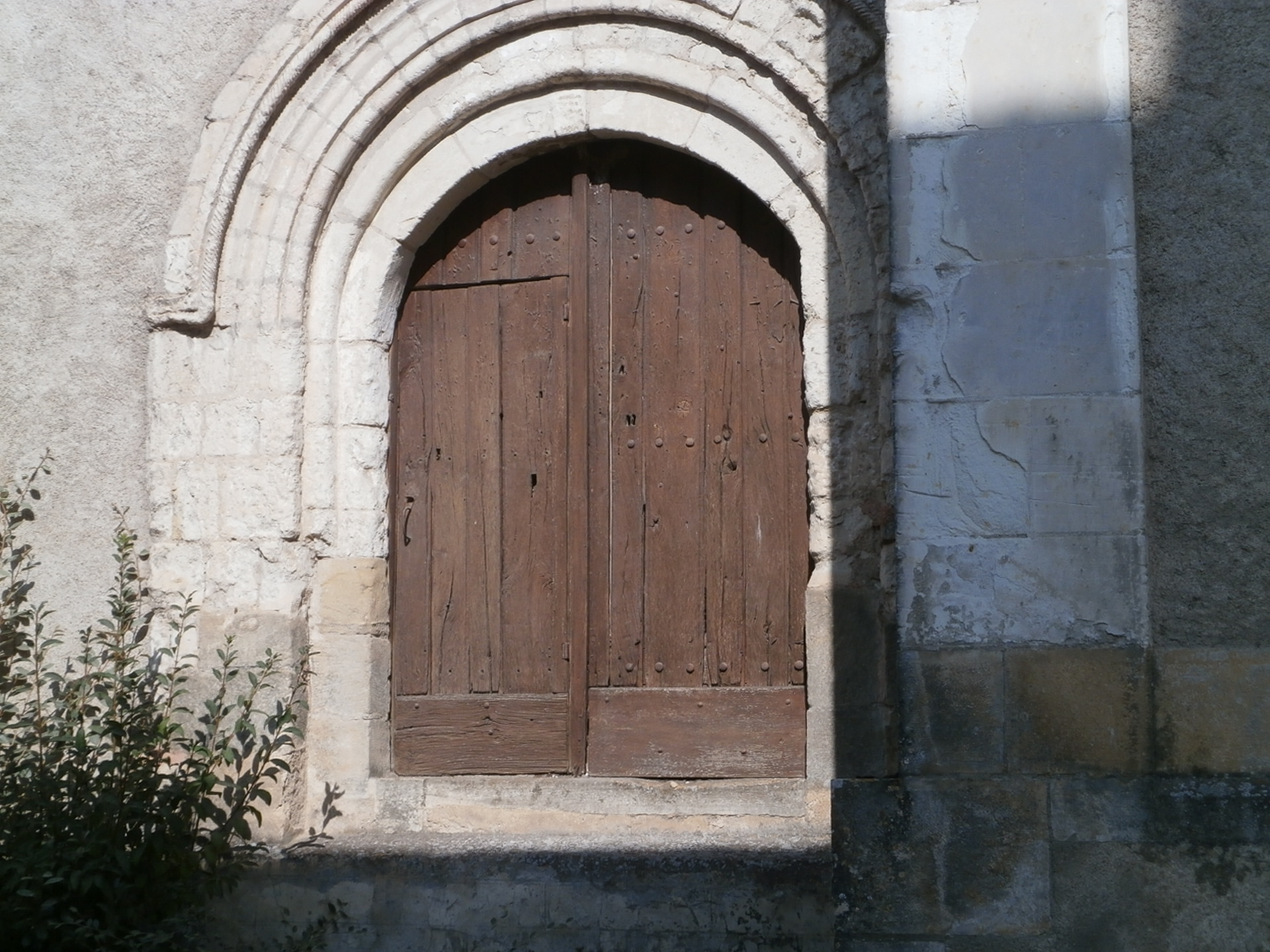
The Romanesque door of the church of St. Martin.

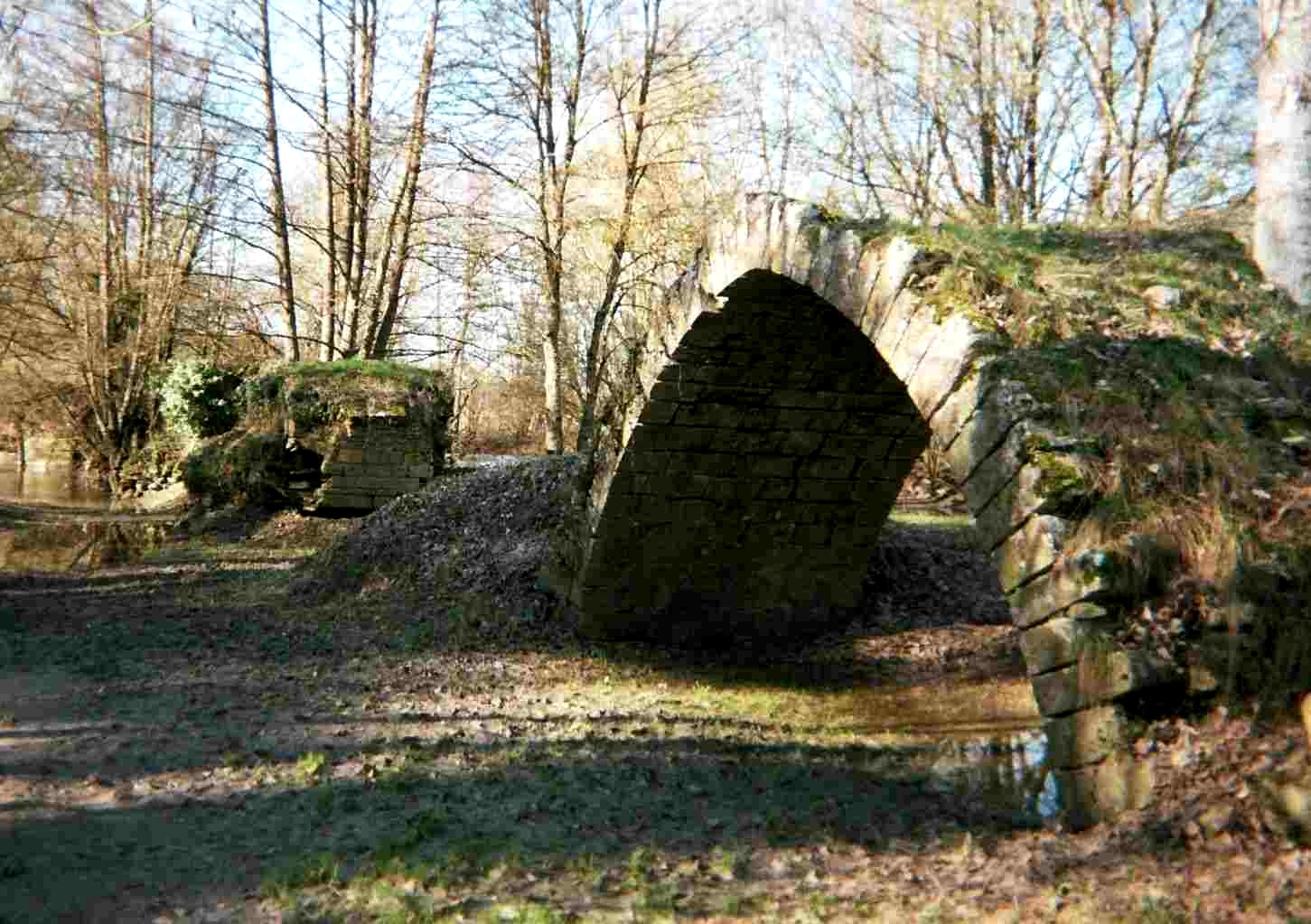
The eastern arch of the bridge of the Auger Island.

=== Natural heritage ===
==== National zones of ecological interest, fauna and flora ====
Having as its goal an inventory of plant and animal species in the area, the creation of Zone naturelle d'intérêt écologique, faunistique et floristique (ZNIEFF) is accompanied by no measure of regulatory protection. The municipality of Chambourg-sur-Indre is integrated to the tip of its territory, as far as Chédigny, Saint-Quentin-sur-Indrois and Ferrière-sur-Beaulieu, the ZNIEFF of Massif forestier de Loches (Loches Forest): This ZNIEFF contains 5066 hectares and extends over 10 communes. Considered one of the richest wooded areas of Indre-et-Loire, the forest of Loches hosts several remarkable species. Some of them are protected at national or regional level, such as the lesser horseshoe bat, a species of bat that hunts on the edge of this forest, the stag beetle (Lucanus cervus), whose larvae live in the trunks of dead trees on which they feed, or the adder's-tongue (Ophioglossum vulgatum), a rare fern.

==== Natura 2000 network ====
Since 2006, about a fifth of Chambourg-sur-Indre, to the west, next to the communes of Azay-sur-Indre and Dolus-le-Sec has been included in the Natura 2000 network of nature protection areas. The Special Protection Area (ZPS) thus formed, called site Natura 2000 Champeigne, is found on the ZNIEFF of plateau Champeigne between Bléré and Loches; it aims at the preservation of bird species encountered in its territory, as the little bustard (Tetrax Tetrax), through appropriate agri-environmental measures imposed on farms, in accordance with Birds Directive of 30 November 2009 enacted by the European Union.

==== Other natural heritage items ====
The Eurasian beaver, which is reclaiming streams in Touraine after its reintroduction in the Loire about thirty years ago, and the European otter (Lutra lutra) are present on the Indre, in Chambourg-sur-Indre, for the 2014–2015 season.

Hiking trail 46, which enters Tours at Cahuzac-sur-Vère in Tarn department travels through Chambourg-sur-Indre via the Indre Valley.

Specimens of Protected Fauna and Flora in Chambourg-sur-Indre (ZNIEFF and Natura 2000).

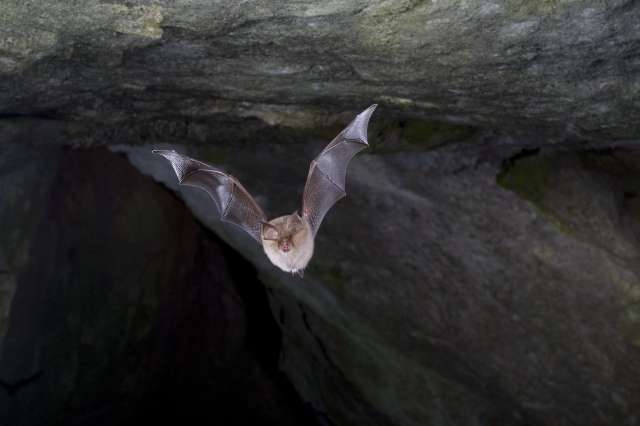
Lesser Horseshoe Bat

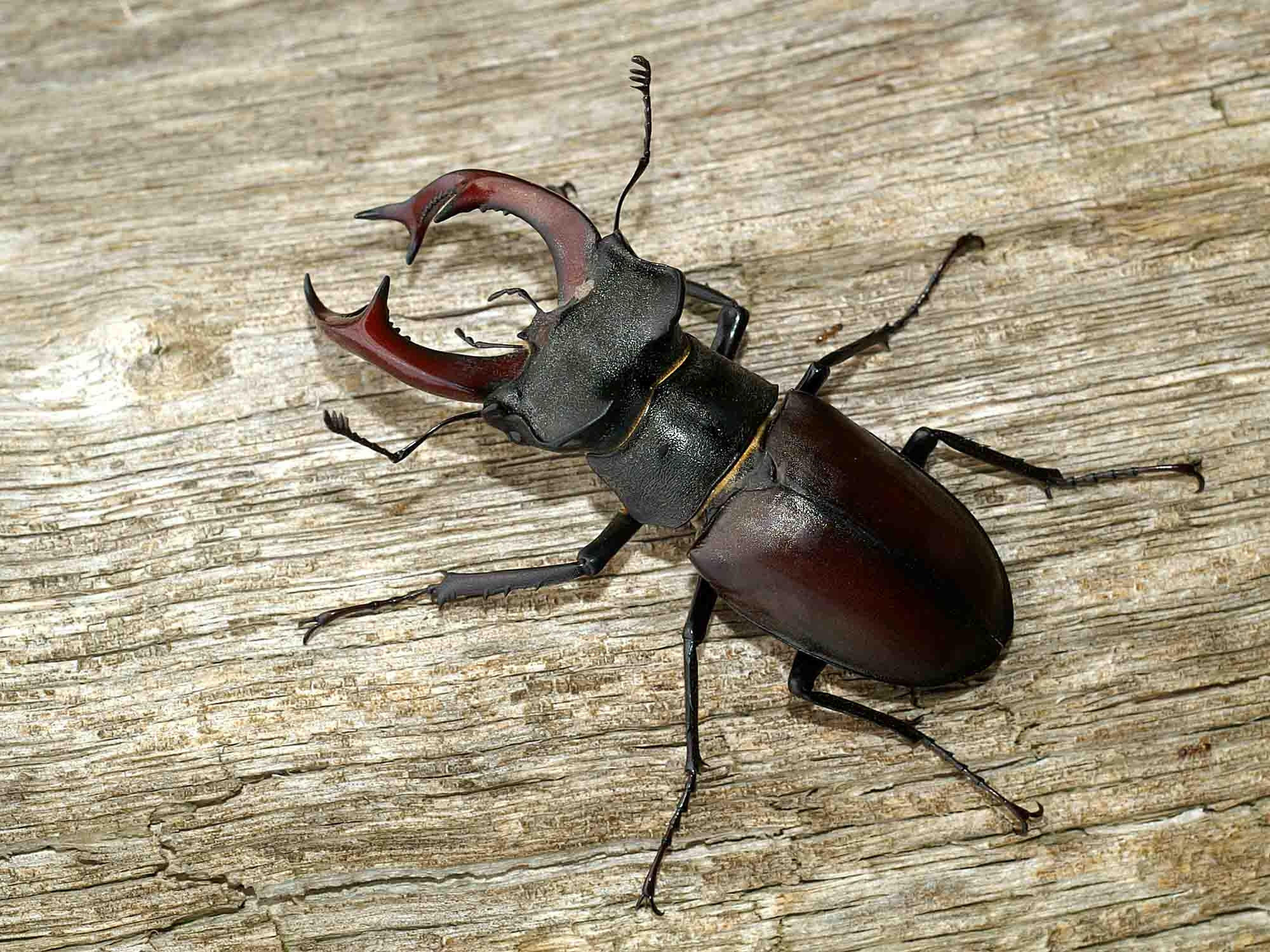
stag beetle (male)

Adder's tongue

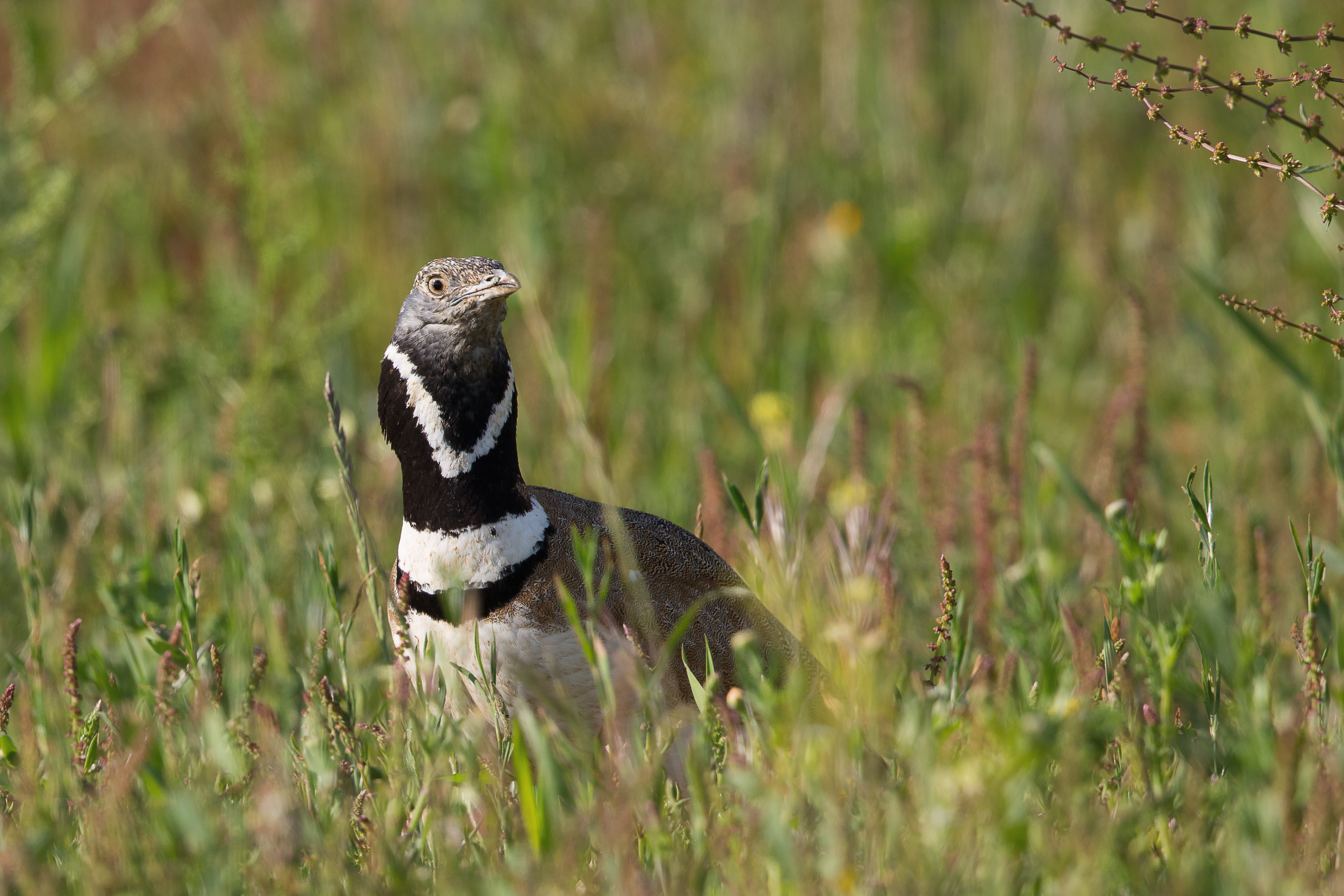
Little bustard

=== Gastronomic heritage ===
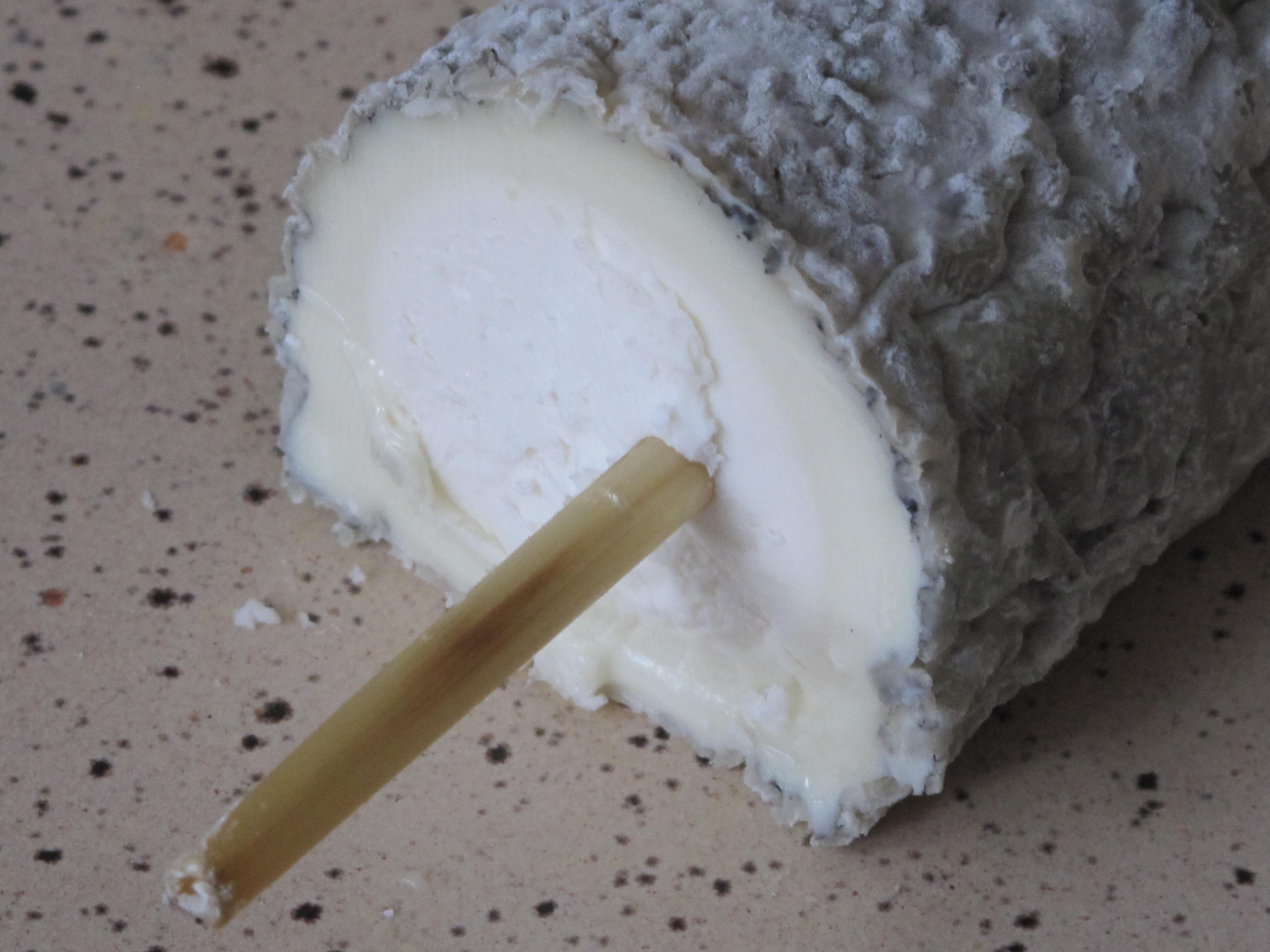
Sainte-Maure de Touraine.

The town of Chambourg-sur-Indre is located near Sainte-Maure-de-Touraine where a goat cheese is produced that has geographical indications and traditional specialities in the European Union (Appellation d'origine contrôlée (AOC) in French) status. 24 products in the Chambourg-sur-Indre have a fr:indication géographique protégée (protected geographical indication (PGI)): fr:rillettes de Tours, volailles du Berry (Berry chickens), ins du Val de Loire (Loire Valley wines), de l'Allier, du Cher, de l'Indre, du Pays de Retz et primeur.

=== Personalities linked to the town ===
Delataille Emile (1848–1902), carpenter, Compagnons du Tour de France, a member of the National Academy of Fine Arts of the Institute France and the Regional School of Fine Arts in Tours, was born in Chambourg-sur-Indre.

== See also ==
- Communes of the Indre-et-Loire department

== Bibliography ==
- Briais, Bernard (1988). Le Lochois pendant la guerre 1939-1945 [The Lochois during the 1939-1945 war] (in French). Chambray-lès-Tours: CLD. p. 191. Briais.
- Couderc, Jean-Mary (1987). Dictionnaire des communes de Touraine [Dictionary of the Communes of Touraine] (in French). Chambray-lès-Tours: C.L.D. p. 967. ISBN 978-2854431360.
- Croubois, Claude (1986). L'indre-et-Loire – La Touraine, des origines à nos jours [The Indre-et-Loire - La Touraine, from its origins to today]. L’histoire par les documents (in French). Saint-Jean-d’Angely: Bordessoules. p. 470. ISBN 2-90350-409-1. Croubois.
- Gendron, Stéphane (2012). L'origine des noms de lieux de l'Indre-et-Loire [The origin of the place names of the Indre-et-Loire] (in French). Chemillé-sur-Indrois: Hugues de Chivré. p. 303. ISBN 978-2916043456.
- Ranjard, Robert (1986). La Touraine archéologique [Archaeology of Touraine] (in French). Mayenne: Imprimerie de la Manutention. p. 735. ISBN 978-2-855-54017-7. Ranjard.
