= Xavier de Sade =

French agricultural engineer and estate owner (1922–2010)

- Born: Xavier Marie Henri de Sade; 20 April 1922; La Croix-en-Touraine, Indre-et-Loire, France
- Died: 25 August 2010 (aged 88); Luynes, Indre-et-Loire, France
- Occupation: Agricultural engineer
- Known for: Restoration of the Château de Condé; stewardship of the Sade family archives

Xavier Marie Henri de Sade (20 April 1922 – 25 August 2010), commonly styled Comte Xavier de Sade, was a French agricultural engineer and the owner of the Château de Condé at Condé-en-Brie. During the Second World War he served as an officer and was captured by the Germans. After returning to France in 1945, he spent approximately twenty years restoring the war-damaged Château de Condé, later using the property for cultural events and private functions.

De Sade was also the custodian of an extensive collection of family papers. Beginning in 1948, he gave scholars including Gilbert Lely access to previously unavailable manuscripts and correspondence belonging to his ancestor, the writer Donatien Alphonse François de Sade. The collection subsequently became an important source for twentieth-century scholarship on the writer.

== Early life and military service ==
Xavier Marie Henri de Sade was born on 20 April 1922 at La Croix-en-Touraine, in the department of Indre-et-Loire. His full name, date and place of birth are recorded in French death records. He was the son of Bernard Georges Marie de Sade and Jeanne Marie Gilberte de Sarrazin.

During the Second World War, de Sade served as an officer and was arrested while assisting escaped prisoners in passing from German-occupied France into the unoccupied zone. He said that he subsequently spent approximately a year and a half in German custody, including imprisonment in Silesia, followed by seven months in Soviet custody. De Sade stated that he escaped from a camp in Siberia in 1945 and returned to France after travelling through Russia and Poland.

== Career and Château de Condé ==
After the war, de Sade returned to the Château de Condé at Condé-en-Brie. He recalled that the château had been badly damaged during the fighting, with much of its roofing destroyed and only parts of its walls remaining. According to de Sade, its reconstruction occupied approximately the next twenty years.

De Sade developed the château as both a family residence and an income-producing property. By the early 1980s it was being used as a venue for weddings and baptisms as well as chamber concerts and theatrical performances. In his 1983 interview, de Sade said that income from these activities had helped support the family and maintain the estate.

The château contained substantial historic interiors and collections. Le Monde noted in 1976 that it retained paintings and decorative schemes by artists including Jean-Baptiste Oudry and Giovanni Niccolò Servandoni, as well as furniture and manuscripts, and was open to visitors during part of the year. De Sade had five children as of 1971.

== Sade family archives ==
De Sade became custodian of the surviving archives of the Sade family after the death of his father. The papers included correspondence, journals, literary manuscripts and other documents accumulated by earlier generations of the family.

In 1948, de Sade allowed the poet, editor and biographer Gilbert Lely to examine a body of previously inaccessible family papers at the Château de Condé. The material made available by de Sade contributed to Lely's biography of the Marquis and to editions of his correspondence. Among the documents preserved in the family collection were letters written during the Marquis's imprisonment and literary and autobiographical manuscripts.

A 1972 review in the academic journal Dix-Huitième Siècle identified the manuscript used for the published Journal inédit as coming from the family archives of the Comte Xavier de Sade. Academic work on Sade continued to draw on the collection in subsequent decades.

The historian and biographer Maurice Lever was given extensive access to the archives during the 1980s and 1990s. The French Diplomatic Archives state that Lever made substantial use of the collection in his publications and specifically acknowledged Xavier de Sade for opening the family archive to him.

Xavier de Sade and his wife later sold portions of the archive. According to the Diplomatic Archives, documents were dispersed progressively, and sixteen items now described in its catalogue had been acquired from the couple by the Galerie des Augustins in October 1994.

== Public discussion of the Sade family ==
As the family papers became more widely studied, de Sade occasionally appeared in the press and on television to discuss the history of his family and the reputation of the Marquis de Sade.

In 1972, he was interviewed at the Château de Condé for French television. During the interview, he argued that the public image of the Marquis placed disproportionate emphasis on his sexual writings and conduct while overlooking his correspondence and historical writings. He also criticised the use of the words sadism and sadistic as derivatives of the family name.

== Death ==
Xavier de Sade died at Luynes, Indre-et-Loire, on 25 August 2010, aged 88.

== See also ==
- Château de Condé
- Marquis de Sade
- Gilbert Lely
