= Civray =

Civray may refer to the following places in France:

- Civray, Cher, a commune in the department of Cher
- Civray, Vienne, a commune in the department of Vienne
- Civray-de-Touraine, a commune in the department of Indre-et-Loire
- Civray-sur-Esves, a commune in the department of Indre-et-Loire
