= Dierre =

- Commune
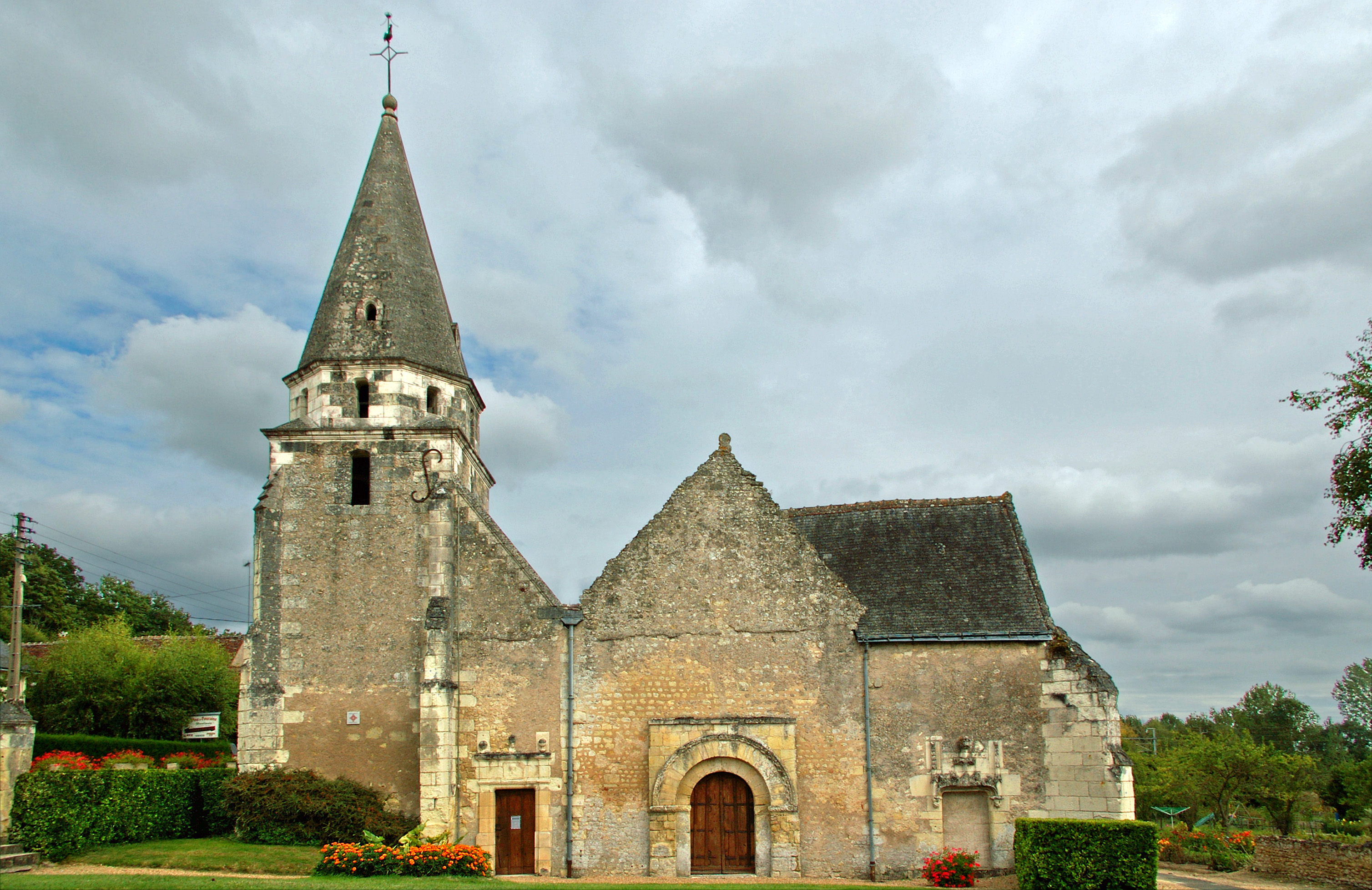
- The church of Saint Médard, in Dierre

- Coat of arms
- Location of Dierre
- Location within France Location within Centre-Val de Loire
- Coordinates: 47°20′49″N 0°57′11″E
- Country: France
- Region: Centre-Val de Loire
- Department: Indre-et-Loire
- Arrondissement: Loches
- Canton: Bléré

Government
  - Mayor (2020–2026): Max Besnard
- Area^{1}: 10.27 km^{2} (3.97 sq mi)
- Highest elevation: 115 m (377 ft)
- Lowest elevation: 52 m (171 ft)
- Population (2023): 645
  - Density: 62.8/km^{2} (163/sq mi)
- Time zone: UTC+01:00 (CET)
  - Summer (DST): UTC+02:00 (CEST)
- INSEE/Postal code: 37096 /37150
- ^{1} French Land Register data, which excludes lakes, ponds, glaciers > 1 km^{2} (0.386 sq mi or 247 acres) and river estuaries.

Dierre (French pronunciation: [djɛʁ]) is a commune in the Indre-et-Loire department in central France.

== Population ==
Historical population
Year	Pop.	±% p.a.
1968	426	—
1975	408	−0.61%
1982	416	+0.28%
1990	464	+1.37%
1999	496	+0.74%
2007	563	+1.60%
2012	576	+0.46%
2017	608	+1.09%
2023	645	+0.99%
Source: INSEE

The inhabitants are called Dierrois in French.

== See also ==
- Communes of the Indre-et-Loire department
