= Canton of Bléré =

Coordinates: 47.33°N 0.99°E

The canton of Bléré is an administrative division of the Indre-et-Loire department, central France. Its borders were modified at the French canton reorganisation which came into effect in March 2015. Its seat is in Bléré.

It consists of the following communes:

1. Athée-sur-Cher
2. Azay-sur-Cher
3. Bléré
4. Céré-la-Ronde
5. Chenonceaux
6. Chisseaux
7. Cigogné
8. Civray-de-Touraine
9. Cormery
10. Courçay
11. La Croix-en-Touraine
12. Dierre
13. Épeigné-les-Bois
14. Francueil
15. Luzillé
16. Saint-Martin-le-Beau
17. Sublaines
