= Cormery Abbey =

Former Benedictine abbey in France

Cormery Abbey Abbaye Saint-Paul de Cormery
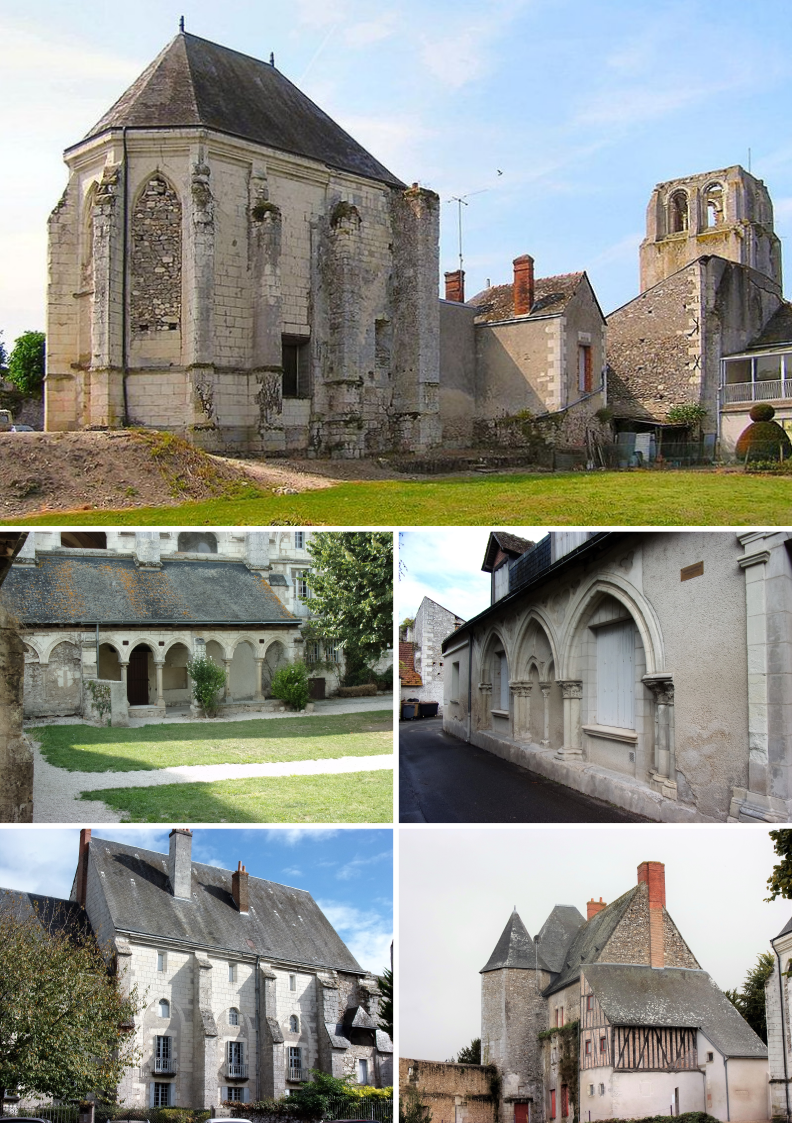
- Remains of the abbey. From top to bottom: Saint-Symphorien chapel and Saint-Paul tower; cloister and chapter house; refectory and abbey house.

- Location within France

Monastery information
- Order: Benedictine
- Established: 791
- Disestablished: 1790
- Dedication: Saint Paul
- Diocese: Tours

People
- Founders: Ithier, abbot of Saint-Martin

Site
- Location: Cormery, France
- Coordinates: 47°16′8.3994″N 0°50′12.8394″E

Cormery Abbey or the Abbey of Saint Paul, Cormery (French: Abbaye Saint-Paul de Cormery), is a former Benedictine abbey located on the territory of the commune of Cormery in the French department of Indre-et-Loire in the Centre-Val de Loire region.

== History ==
Ithier, abbot of Saint Martin in Tours, founded a monastic cell here in 791, which was raised in the year 800 to the rank of abbey by Alcuin, and adopted the Rule of Saint Benedict. It was then attached to the Abbey of Saint Martin in Tours, and remained so until its dissolution during the Revolution. Despite the damage caused by the Vikings in the second half of the ninth century, which is difficult to quantify, the abbey developed rapidly, and around it the town of Cormery. In the middle of the Middle Ages, the abbey had many possessions in several French provinces and its boats could navigate freely on all the waterways of the kingdom; with fifty monks, it was one of the most powerful abbeys in Tours. During his tour of France in 1096, Pope Urban II confirmed the authority of the abbey of St Martin of Tours over the abbey of Cormery and that each newly elected abbot had to be invested with his pastoral staff at the tomb of St Martin. On July 19, 1103, Guillermus Ludovicus, bishop of Salpi and former monk of the monastery, presented abbot Guy (abbot between 1070 and 1111) with several relics such as the heads of St James the Persian and St Adrian and hairs of St Paul that Guillermus had collected while serving as chaplain in Nicomedia in the Byzantine Empire.

The abbey was able to recover from damages it incurred in the Hundred Years' War but it never fully recovered from destructions by the Protestants which it suffered in the Wars of Religion when many of its relics were desecrated and scattered. In spite of the intervention of the Maurists from 1662 onwards, it did not regain its lustre: its numbers diminished inexorably and it was already weakened when it finally succumbed to the suppression of religious communities during the French Revolution, in 1790. The last monks were dispersed; the buildings were sold as national property and either destroyed or divided up and then redesigned.

In the 21st century, however, there are still significant remains of the abbey, although scattered in an urban landscape where their original unity is sometimes difficult to identify among more recent constructions. These remains include a few fragments of the former abbey church, among them Saint Paul's tower (the bell tower porch) and the Gothic Saint Symphorian's chapel (formerly north of the choir). The refectory has been largely preserved even though it has undergone a lot of remodelling, and a portion of the gallery of the cloister is still standing. On the periphery of the monastic enclosure, the dwellings of the abbot, the prior and the sacristan remain. In stages between 1908 and 1933, all of these remains, with the exception of the sacristan's dwelling, were classified or registered as historical monuments, while the capitals of the preserved parts are listed in the general inventory of cultural heritage.
