= Courçay =

- Commune
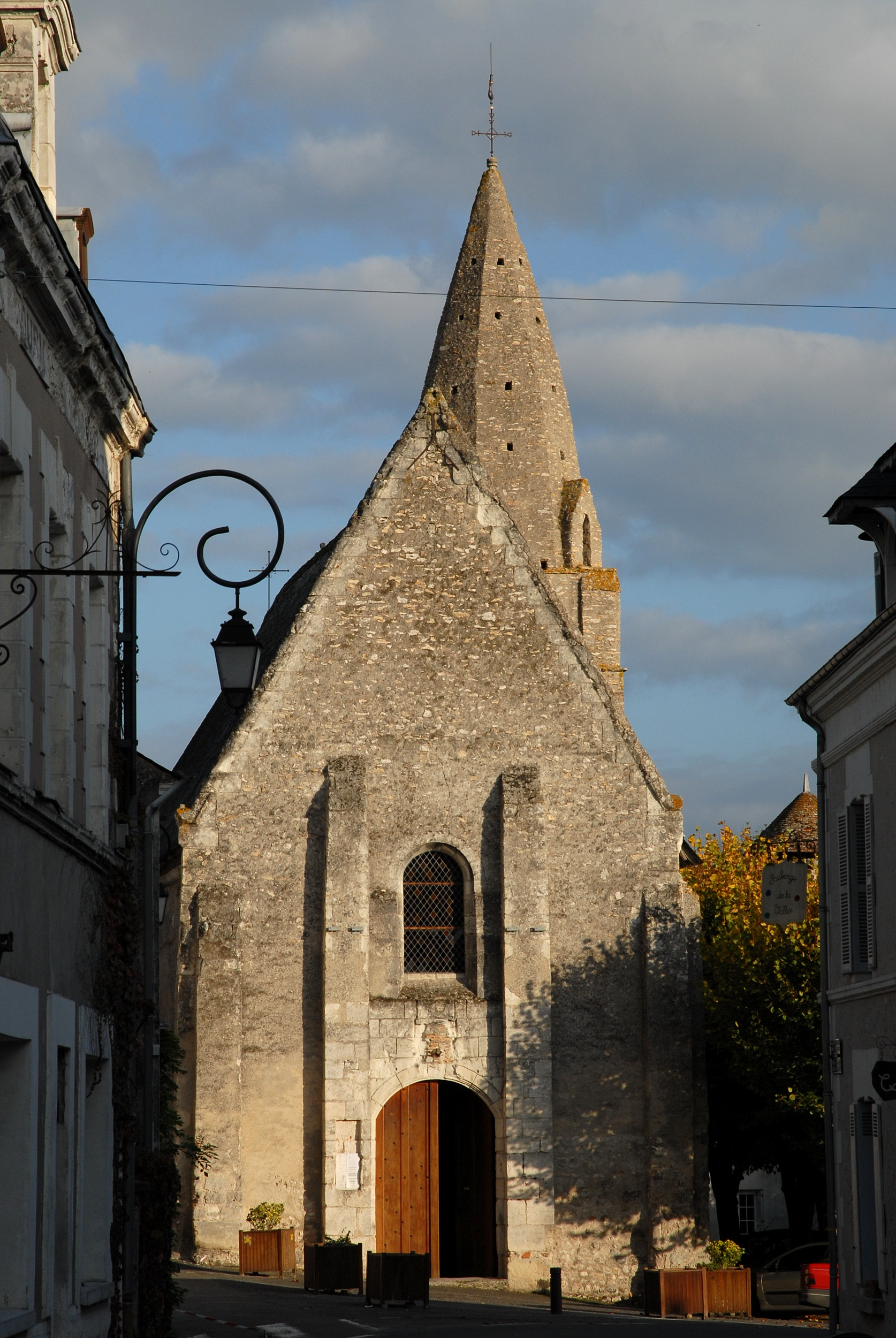
- The church of Saint-Urbain, in Courçay

- Coat of arms
- Location of Courçay
- Location within France Location within Centre-Val de Loire
- Coordinates: 47°15′05″N 0°52′35″E
- Country: France
- Region: Centre-Val de Loire
- Department: Indre-et-Loire
- Arrondissement: Loches
- Canton: Bléré

Government
  - Mayor (2020–2026): Anne Bayon de Noyer
- Area^{1}: 24.77 km^{2} (9.56 sq mi)
- Highest elevation: 99 m (325 ft)
- Lowest elevation: 57 m (187 ft)
- Population (2023): 792
  - Density: 32.0/km^{2} (82.8/sq mi)
- Time zone: UTC+01:00 (CET)
  - Summer (DST): UTC+02:00 (CEST)
- INSEE/Postal code: 37085 /37310
- ^{1} French Land Register data, which excludes lakes, ponds, glaciers > 1 km^{2} (0.386 sq mi or 247 acres) and river estuaries.

Courçay (French pronunciation: [kuʁsɛ]) is a commune in the Indre-et-Loire department in central France.

== Population ==
Historical population
Year	Pop.	±% p.a.
1968	540	—
1975	466	−2.08%
1982	489	+0.69%
1990	703	+4.64%
1999	694	−0.14%
2007	771	+1.32%
2012	847	+1.90%
2017	807	−0.96%
2023	792	−0.31%
Source: INSEE

== See also ==
- Communes of the Indre-et-Loire department
