= Cigogné =

- Commune
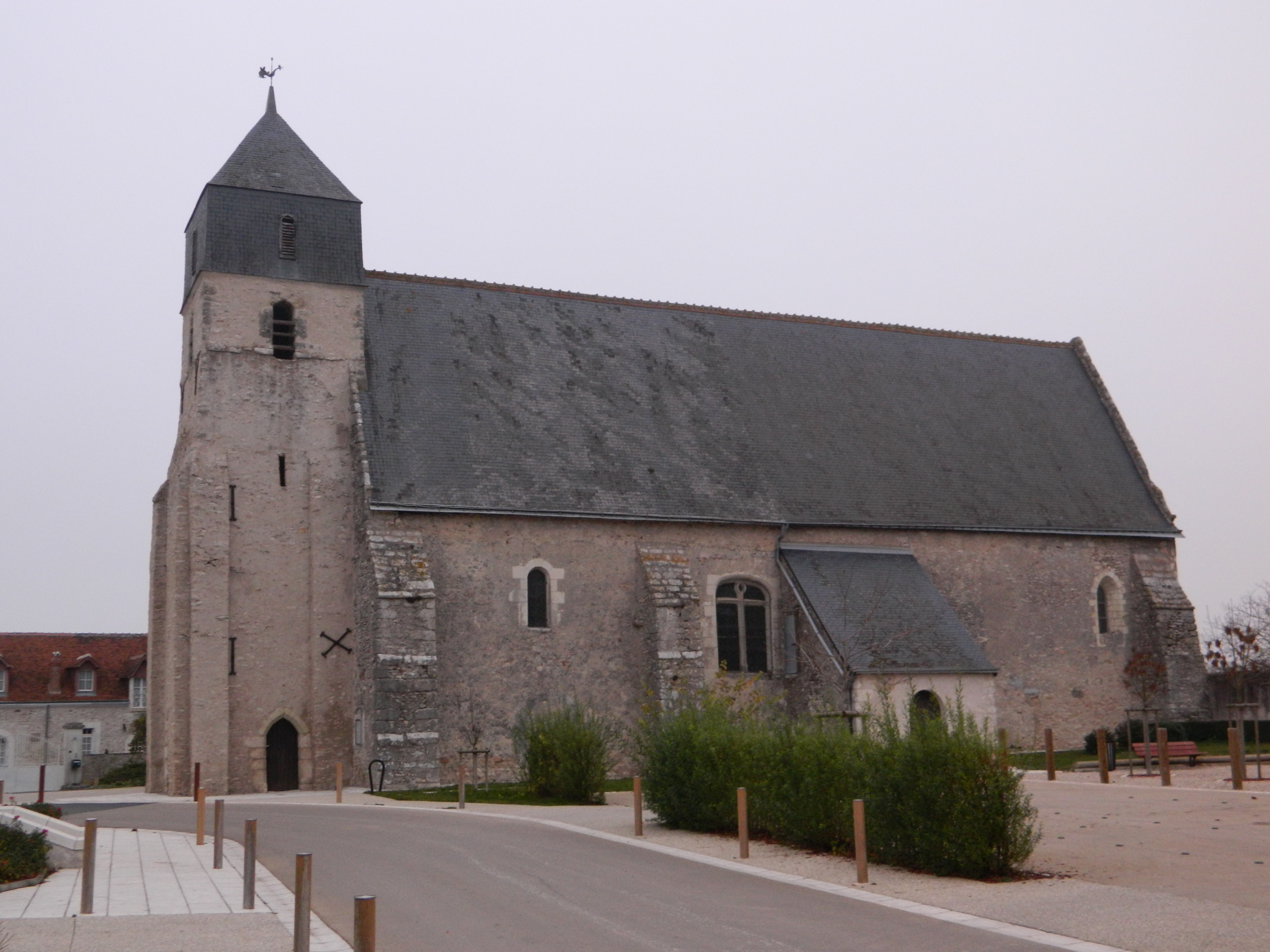
- The parish church of Our Lady, in Cigogné

- Coat of arms
- Location of Cigogné
- Location within France Location within Centre-Val de Loire
- Coordinates: 47°15′37″N 0°55′53″E
- Country: France
- Region: Centre-Val de Loire
- Department: Indre-et-Loire
- Arrondissement: Loches
- Canton: Bléré

Government
  - Mayor (2023–2026): Jean-Jacques De Smet
- Area^{1}: 21.79 km^{2} (8.41 sq mi)
- Highest elevation: 106 m (348 ft)
- Lowest elevation: 73 m (240 ft)
- Population (2023): 460
  - Density: 21/km^{2} (55/sq mi)
- Time zone: UTC+01:00 (CET)
  - Summer (DST): UTC+02:00 (CEST)
- INSEE/Postal code: 37075 /37310
- ^{1} French Land Register data, which excludes lakes, ponds, glaciers > 1 km^{2} (0.386 sq mi or 247 acres) and river estuaries.

Cigogné (French pronunciation: [siɡɔɲe]) is a commune in the Indre-et-Loire department in central France.

== Population ==
Historical population
Year	Pop.	±% p.a.
1968	282	—
1975	230	−2.87%
1982	213	−1.09%
1990	256	+2.33%
1999	307	+2.04%
2007	320	+0.52%
2012	373	+3.11%
2017	434	+3.08%
2023	460	+0.97%
Source: INSEE

== See also ==
- Communes of the Indre-et-Loire department
