= Luzillé =

- Commune
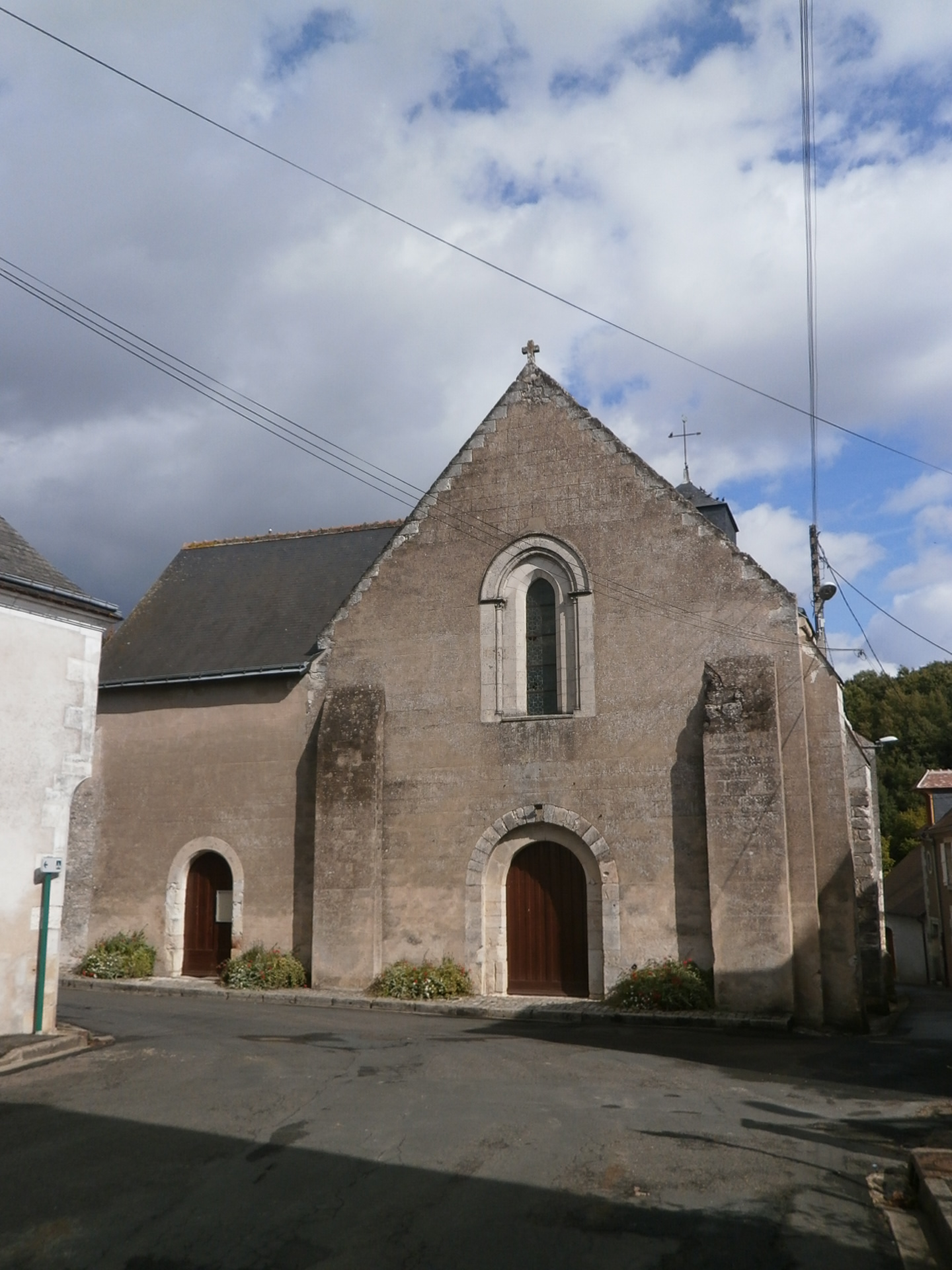
- The church of Sainte-Luce, in Luzillé

- Coat of arms
- Location of Luzillé
- Location within France Location within Centre-Val de Loire
- Coordinates: 47°15′47″N 1°03′41″E
- Country: France
- Region: Centre-Val de Loire
- Department: Indre-et-Loire
- Arrondissement: Loches
- Canton: Bléré

Government
  - Mayor (2024–2026): Hélène Harbonnier
- Area^{1}: 40.68 km^{2} (15.71 sq mi)
- Highest elevation: 132 m (433 ft)
- Lowest elevation: 68 m (223 ft)
- Population (2023): 987
  - Density: 24.3/km^{2} (62.8/sq mi)
- Time zone: UTC+01:00 (CET)
  - Summer (DST): UTC+02:00 (CEST)
- INSEE/Postal code: 37141 /37150
- ^{1} French Land Register data, which excludes lakes, ponds, glaciers > 1 km^{2} (0.386 sq mi or 247 acres) and river estuaries.

Luzillé (French pronunciation: [lyzije]) is a commune in the Indre-et-Loire department in central France.

== Population ==
Historical population
Year	Pop.	±% p.a.
1968	878	—
1975	739	−2.43%
1982	691	−0.95%
1990	737	+0.81%
1999	769	+0.47%
2007	893	+1.89%
2012	894	+0.02%
2017	983	+1.92%
2023	987	+0.07%
Source: INSEE

== See also ==
- Communes of the Indre-et-Loire department
