= Gilbert Lely =

French poet

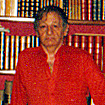
Gilbert Lely

Gilbert Lely (19 March 1904 - 4 June 1985) was a French poet and writer. He is best known for his biography of the Marquis de Sade.

== Personal life ==
Lély was born Pierre Raphaël Gilbert Lévy on 19 March 1904 in Neuilly-sur-Seine and died on 4 June 1985 in Paris.

During World War II, he was friends with René Char.

== Writing ==
In the 1930s he was part of the surrealist movement and was admired by André Suarès, André Breton and Yves Bonnefoy.

His first book Les Métamorphoses (1930) was a translation of Ovid. He also published a translation of a twelfth-century Anglo-Norman poem, La Folie Tristan, in 1954.

His poetry collections include Arden (1933), La Sylphide ou l’Étoile Carnivore (1938), and his most significant collection, Ma Civilisation (1942).

His best known work is the biography, Vie du Marquis de Sade (1952-1957). Based on previously unpublished manuscripts provided to Lely from the family archives by Xavier Henri Marie de Sade, the book "changed the whole course of Sade studies". Lély took over the task of publishing Sade's works from Maurice Heine. The complete edition (1962–64) also includes previously unpublished correspondence.

Lély wrote about the history of medicine in the journal Hippocrates.

His late work consists of L'Épouse Infidèle (1966) and the dramatic poem Solomonie la Possédée (1979).
