= Sublaines =

- Commune
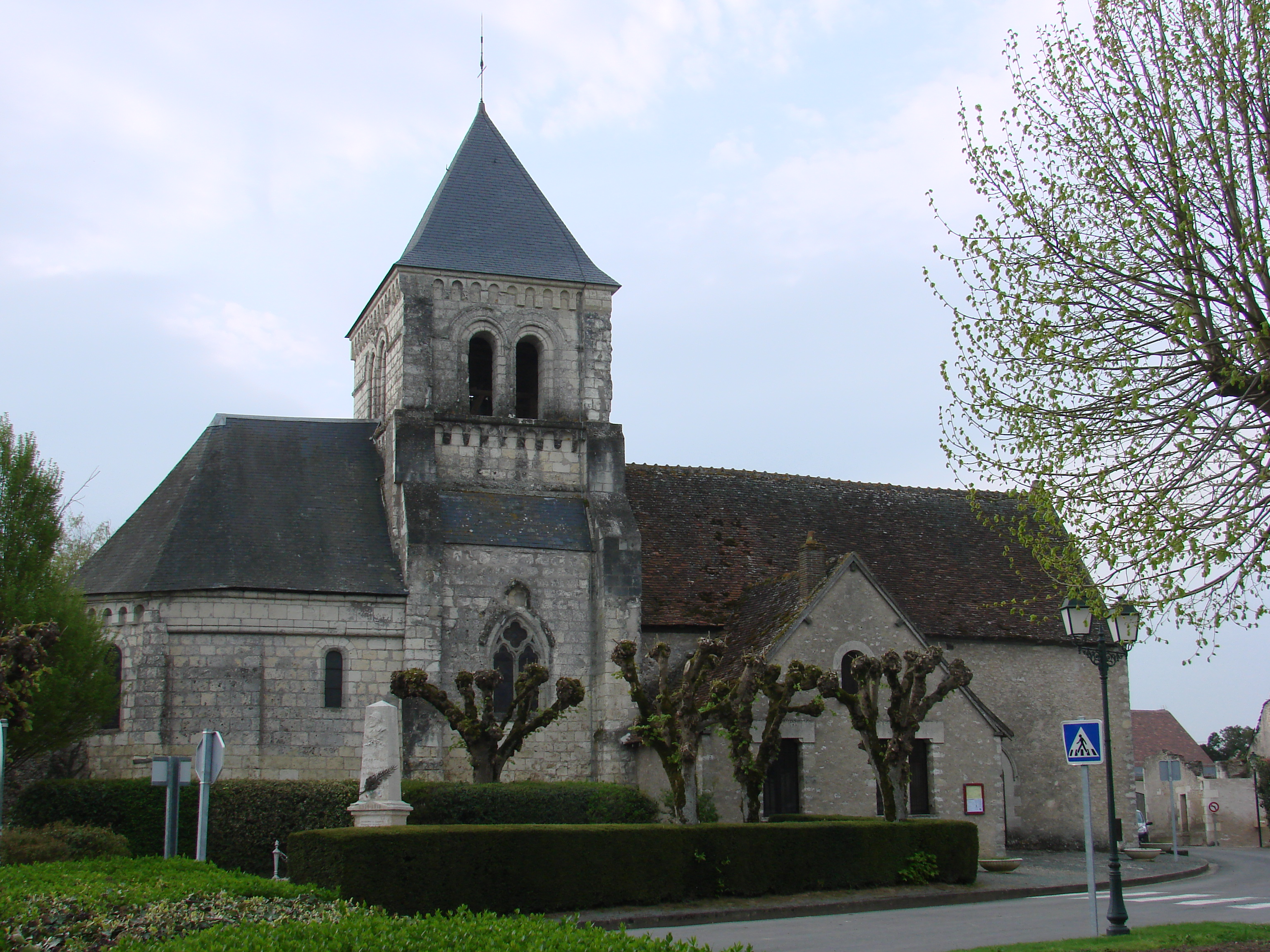
- Saint-Martin Church

- Coat of arms
- Location of Sublaines
- Location within France Location within Centre-Val de Loire
- Coordinates: 47°15′55″N 0°59′31″E
- Country: France
- Region: Centre-Val de Loire
- Department: Indre-et-Loire
- Arrondissement: Loches
- Canton: Bléré

Government
  - Mayor (2020–2026): Jérôme Jarry
- Area^{1}: 14.44 km^{2} (5.58 sq mi)
- Highest elevation: 117 m (384 ft)
- Lowest elevation: 87 m (285 ft)
- Population (2023): 176
  - Density: 12.2/km^{2} (31.6/sq mi)
- Time zone: UTC+01:00 (CET)
  - Summer (DST): UTC+02:00 (CEST)
- INSEE/Postal code: 37253 /37310
- ^{1} French Land Register data, which excludes lakes, ponds, glaciers > 1 km^{2} (0.386 sq mi or 247 acres) and river estuaries.

Sublaines (French pronunciation: [syblɛn]) is a commune in the Indre-et-Loire department in central France.

== Population ==
Historical population
| Year | Pop. | ±% p.a. |
|---|---|---|
| 1968 | 167 | — |
| 1975 | 154 | −1.15% |
| 1982 | 153 | −0.09% |
| 1990 | 155 | +0.16% |
| 1999 | 159 | +0.28% |
| 2007 | 173 | +1.06% |
| 2012 | 191 | +2.00% |
| 2017 | 191 | +0.00% |
| 2023 | 176 | −1.35% |
Source: INSEE

== See also ==
- Communes of the Indre-et-Loire department
