= Civray-de-Touraine =

Civray-en-Touraine
- Commune
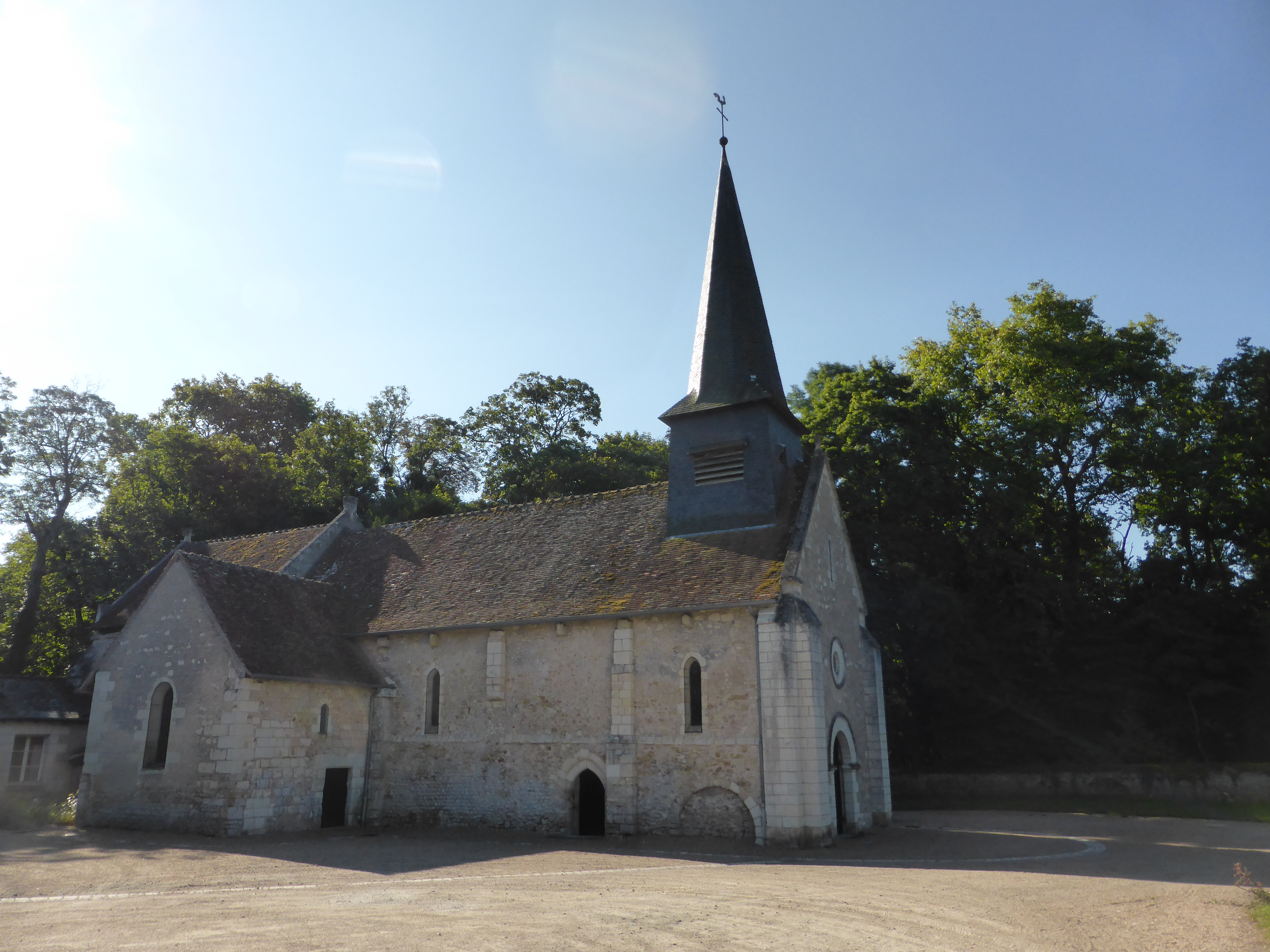
- The church of Saint-Germain, in Civray-de-Touraine

- Coat of arms
- Location of Civray-en-Touraine
- Location within France Location within Centre-Val de Loire
- Coordinates: 47°19′59″N 1°02′58″E
- Country: France
- Region: Centre-Val de Loire
- Department: Indre-et-Loire
- Arrondissement: Loches
- Canton: Bléré

Government
  - Mayor (2020–2026): Fanny Hermange
- Area^{1}: 22.88 km^{2} (8.83 sq mi)
- Highest elevation: 129 m (423 ft)
- Lowest elevation: 46 m (151 ft)
- Population (2023): 1,819
  - Density: 79.50/km^{2} (205.9/sq mi)
- Time zone: UTC+01:00 (CET)
  - Summer (DST): UTC+02:00 (CEST)
- INSEE/Postal code: 37079 /37150
- ^{1} French Land Register data, which excludes lakes, ponds, glaciers > 1 km^{2} (0.386 sq mi or 247 acres) and river estuaries.

Civray-de-Touraine (French pronunciation: [sivʁɛ də tuʁɛn], literally Civray of Touraine) is a commune in the Indre-et-Loire department in central France.

== Population ==
Historical population
Year	Pop.	±% p.a.
1968	918	—
1975	1,037	+1.76%
1982	1,158	+1.59%
1990	1,377	+2.19%
1999	1,523	+1.13%
2007	1,724	+1.56%
2012	1,827	+1.17%
2017	1,840	+0.14%
2023	1,819	−0.19%
Source: INSEE

== See also ==
- Communes of the Indre-et-Loire department
