= La Croix-en-Touraine =

- Commune
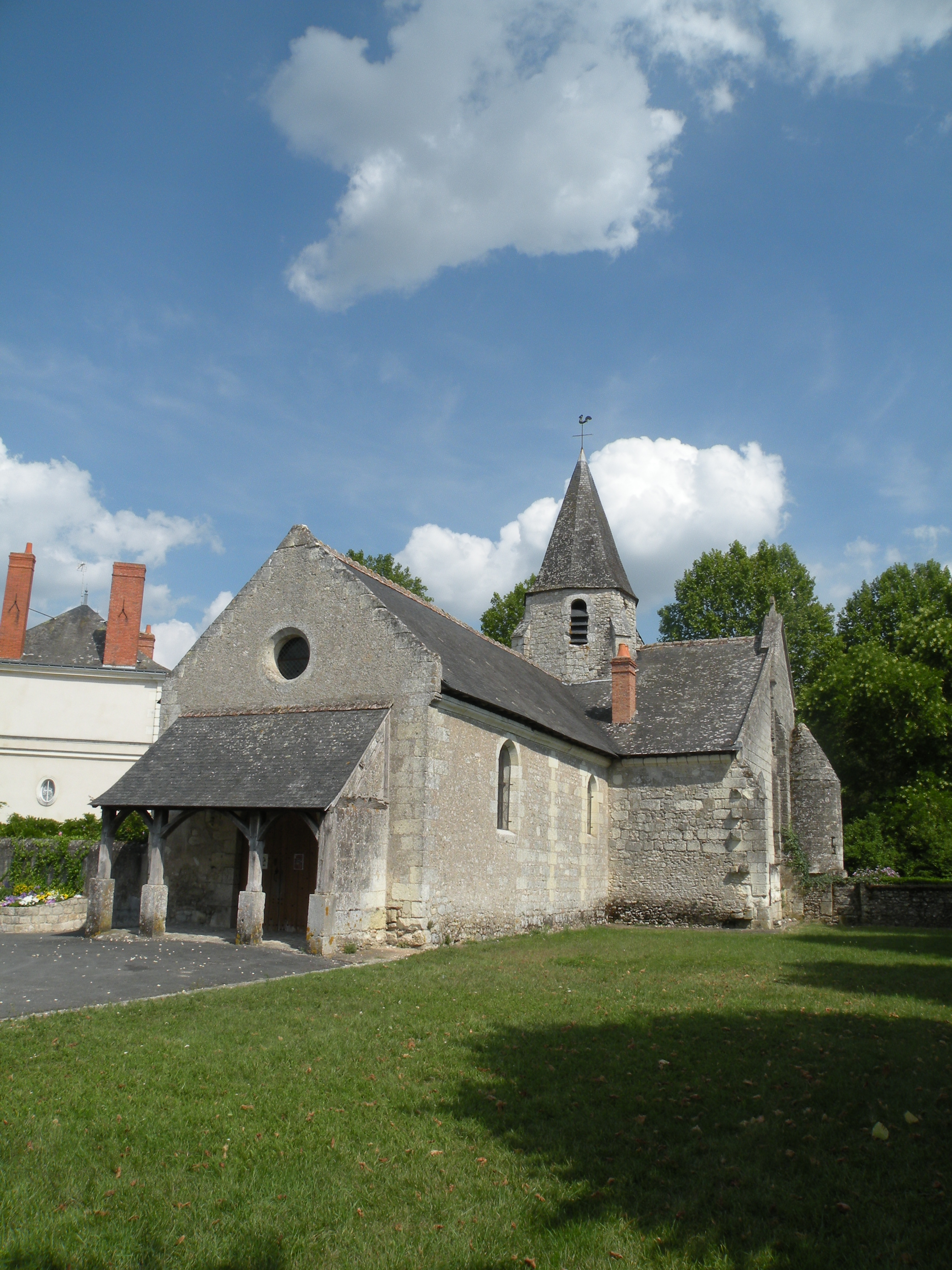
- The church of Saint-Quentin, in La Croix-en-Touraine

- Coat of arms
- Location of La Croix-en-Touraine
- Location within France Location within Centre-Val de Loire
- Coordinates: 47°20′15″N 0°59′29″E
- Country: France
- Region: Centre-Val de Loire
- Department: Indre-et-Loire
- Arrondissement: Loches
- Canton: Bléré

Government
  - Mayor (2020–2026): Michèle Gasnier
- Area^{1}: 15.04 km^{2} (5.81 sq mi)
- Highest elevation: 117 m (384 ft)
- Lowest elevation: 52 m (171 ft)
- Population (2023): 2,543
  - Density: 169.1/km^{2} (437.9/sq mi)
- Time zone: UTC+01:00 (CET)
  - Summer (DST): UTC+02:00 (CEST)
- INSEE/Postal code: 37091 /37150
- ^{1} French Land Register data, which excludes lakes, ponds, glaciers > 1 km^{2} (0.386 sq mi or 247 acres) and river estuaries.

La Croix-en-Touraine (French pronunciation: [la kʁwa ɑ̃ tuʁɛn], literally La Croix in Touraine) is a commune in the Indre-et-Loire department in central France.

== Population ==
Historical population

Year	Pop.	±% p.a.
1793	960	—
1800	1,082	+1.72%
1806	1,068	−0.22%
1821	1,118	+0.31%
1831	1,171	+0.46%
1836	1,148	−0.40%
1841	1,303	+2.57%
1846	1,259	−0.68%
1851	1,386	+1.94%
1856	1,292	−1.39%
1861	1,336	+0.67%
1866	1,384	+0.71%
1872	1,363	−0.25%
1876	1,297	−1.23%
1881	1,242	−0.86%
1886	1,289	+0.75%
1891	1,212	−1.22%
1896	1,213	+0.02%
1901	1,162	−0.86%

Year	Pop.	±% p.a.
1906	1,161	−0.02%
1911	1,207	+0.78%
1921	1,181	−0.22%
1926	1,145	−0.62%
1931	1,132	−0.23%
1936	1,142	+0.18%
1946	1,320	+1.46%
1954	1,202	−1.16%
1962	1,237	+0.36%
1968	1,188	−0.67%
1975	1,260	+0.84%
1982	1,668	+4.09%
1990	1,798	+0.94%
1999	1,973	+1.04%
2007	2,168	+1.19%
2012	2,175	+0.06%
2017	2,294	+1.07%
2023	2,543	+1.73%

Source: EHESS and INSEE (1968-2023)

== See also ==
- Communes of the Indre-et-Loire department
