= Chanceaux-près-Loches =

- Commune
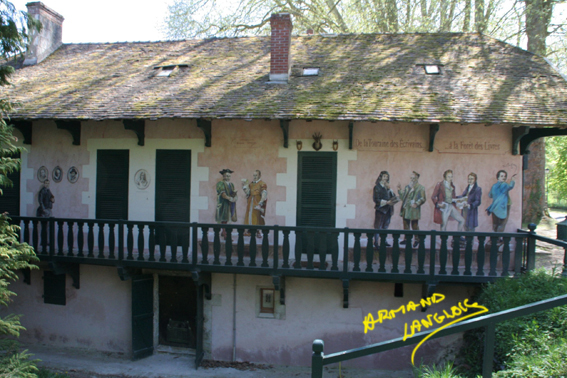
- "The Fresco of the Writers" by Armand Langlois
- Location of Chanceaux-près-Loches
- Location within France Location within Centre-Val de Loire
- Coordinates: 47°08′52″N 0°56′20″E
- Country: France
- Region: Centre-Val de Loire
- Department: Indre-et-Loire
- Arrondissement: Loches
- Canton: Loches
- Intercommunality: CC Loches Sud Touraine

Government
  - Mayor (2020–2026): Jean-Louis Dumortier
- Area^{1}: 14.58 km^{2} (5.63 sq mi)
- Highest elevation: 133 m (436 ft)
- Lowest elevation: 75 m (246 ft)
- Population (2023): 109
  - Density: 7.48/km^{2} (19.4/sq mi)
- Time zone: UTC+01:00 (CET)
  - Summer (DST): UTC+02:00 (CEST)
- INSEE/Postal code: 37053 /37600
- ^{1} French Land Register data, which excludes lakes, ponds, glaciers > 1 km^{2} (0.386 sq mi or 247 acres) and river estuaries.

Chanceaux-près-Loches (French pronunciation: [ʃɑ̃so pʁɛ lɔʃ], literally Chanceaux near Loches) is a commune in the Indre-et-Loire department in central France.

== Population ==
Historical population
Year	Pop.	±% p.a.
1968	163	—
1975	108	−5.71%
1982	155	+5.30%
1990	154	−0.08%
1999	143	−0.82%
2007	150	+0.60%
2012	143	−0.95%
2017	129	−2.04%
2023	109	−2.77%
Source: INSEE

== See also ==
- Communes of the Indre-et-Loire department
