= Reignac-sur-Indre =

- Commune
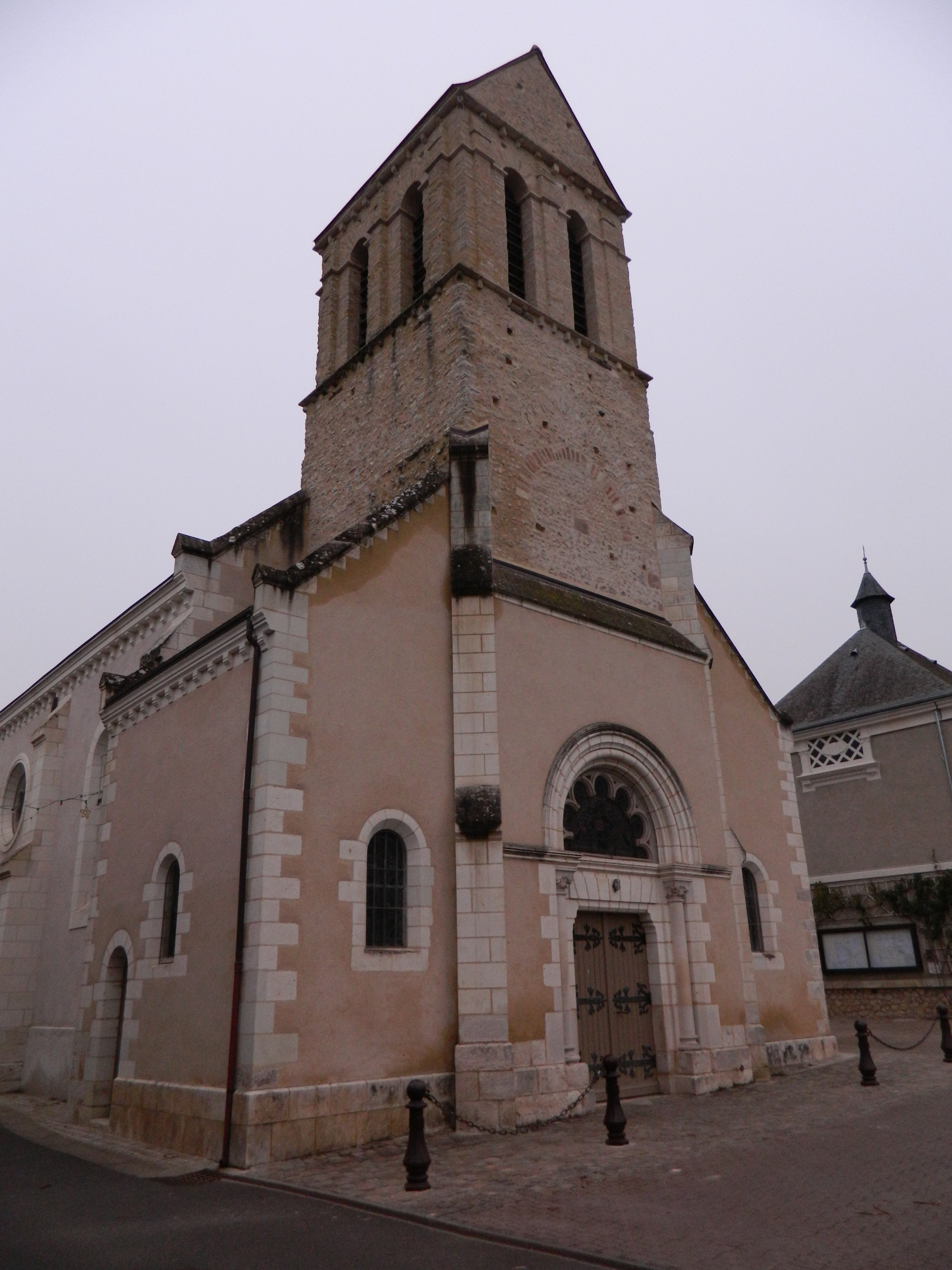
- The parish church of Saint-Etienne, in Reignac-sur-Indre

- Coat of arms
- Location of Reignac-sur-Indre
- Location within France Location within Centre-Val de Loire
- Coordinates: 47°14′00″N 0°55′03″E
- Country: France
- Region: Centre-Val de Loire
- Department: Indre-et-Loire
- Arrondissement: Loches
- Canton: Loches
- Intercommunality: CC Loches Sud Touraine

Government
  - Mayor (2020–2026): Loïc Babary
- Area^{1}: 22.44 km^{2} (8.66 sq mi)
- Highest elevation: 101 m (331 ft)
- Lowest elevation: 60 m (200 ft)
- Population (2023): 1,288
  - Density: 57.40/km^{2} (148.7/sq mi)
- Time zone: UTC+01:00 (CET)
  - Summer (DST): UTC+02:00 (CEST)
- INSEE/Postal code: 37192 /37310
- ^{1} French Land Register data, which excludes lakes, ponds, glaciers > 1 km^{2} (0.386 sq mi or 247 acres) and river estuaries.

Reignac-sur-Indre (French pronunciation: [ʁɛɲak syʁ ɛ̃dʁ], literally Reignac on Indre) is a commune in the Indre-et-Loire department in central France.

== Population ==
Historical population
Year	Pop.	±% p.a.
1968	645	—
1975	685	+0.86%
1982	842	+2.99%
1990	909	+0.96%
1999	1,068	+1.81%
2007	1,186	+1.32%
2012	1,194	+0.13%
2017	1,238	+0.73%
2023	1,288	+0.66%
Source: INSEE

== See also ==
- Communes of the Indre-et-Loire department
