= Cormery =

Commune in Centre-Val de Loire, France

- Commune
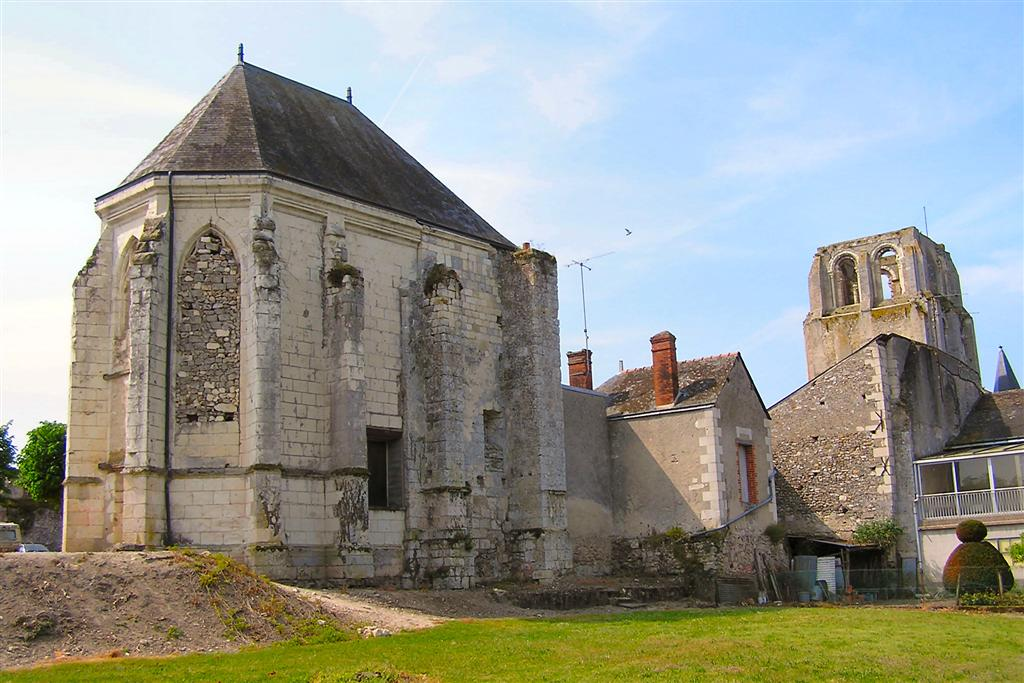
- The abbey in Cormery

- Coat of arms
- Location of Cormery
- Location within France Location within Centre-Val de Loire
- Coordinates: 47°16′05″N 0°50′14″E
- Country: France
- Region: Centre-Val de Loire
- Department: Indre-et-Loire
- Arrondissement: Loches
- Canton: Bléré
- Intercommunality: CC Loches Sud Touraine

Government
  - Mayor (2020–2026): Pascal Debaud
- Area^{1}: 6.07 km^{2} (2.34 sq mi)
- Highest elevation: 94 m (308 ft)
- Lowest elevation: 57 m (187 ft)
- Population (2023): 1,905
  - Density: 314/km^{2} (813/sq mi)
- Time zone: UTC+01:00 (CET)
  - Summer (DST): UTC+02:00 (CEST)
- INSEE/Postal code: 37083 /37320
- ^{1} French Land Register data, which excludes lakes, ponds, glaciers > 1 km^{2} (0.386 sq mi or 247 acres) and river estuaries.

Cormery (French pronunciation: [kɔʁməʁi]) is a commune in the Indre-et-Loire department, Centre-Val de Loire. Its inhabitants are called Cormeriens, Cormeriennes.

== Geography ==
Cormery is located 21 kilometres from Tours and 18 kilometres from Joué-lès-Tours. The area of the town is watered by the Indre river.

== History ==
=== Cormery Abbey ===
In 791, a religious institution was founded by Ithier of St. Martin, abbot of Basilica of St. Martin in Tours and prochancelier of Charlemagne. This edifice was to create a more friendly place for meditation and prayer, plus respect for the rule of Saint Benedict of Nursia. Ithier come here to retreat from the world and its agitations. The modest priory was first called Celle Saint-Paul. Alcuin who succeeded Ithier Cormery led a tremendous spiritual growth and materially transformed the priory into an important abbey by donating important areas. This allowed his successor, Fridugisus, to perform great works.

A protective shadow of the abbey caused many residents to gather and a town was formed which became an important commercial center: since 845 a market is held every Thursday. During the raids of the Vikings up the Loire river, the monks of Saint-Martin first put the holy relics in their safe in Cormery before forced to flee to the east.

The abbey was in ruins in the early eleventh century and was rededicated in 1054. In 1268 to 1271, the abbot was Jean de Brosse, parent of Pierre de Brosse, and close to Philip II of France according to Le Hardi.

In 1562, Cormery was sacked by Huguenots during the Huguenot rebellions. In 1662, the congregation of St Maur recreated a monastic community that would last until the French Revolution when the monastery was resolved.

Only impressive remains are left of the abbey which is objects of study by historians of the region and a cookie recipe "macaroons Abbey".

=== List of mayors ===
List of mayors
Start	End	Name
March 1971	March 1989	Jacques Dupuy
March 1989	June 1995	Bernard Boutet
June 1995	March 2001	Pierre Gargaud
March 2001	March 2008	Jean-Marie Doublé
March 2008		Antoine Campagne

=== Heraldry ===
Description of the emblazon
Original French	Les armes de Cormery se blasonnent ainsi : Mi-parti : au premier d'or à l'aigle bicéphale de sable, au second d'azur aux trois fleurs de lys d'or; à l'épée basse d'argent, garnie d'or, brochant sur la partition
English blazon	The arms of Cormery is emblazoned as follows: Mi-party: the first gold double-headed eagle Sable, second azure three gold fleurs-de-lis; the low silver sword, overlaid with gold, surmounting the partition.
Status	Cormery

=== Drinking water management ===
The town of Cormery is part of the SIPTEC (Syndicat Intercommunal de Truyes-Esvres-Cormery).

== Demographics ==
Historical population
Year	Pop.	±% p.a.
1968	1,032	—
1975	1,106	+0.99%
1982	1,169	+0.79%
1990	1,323	+1.56%
1999	1,542	+1.72%
2007	1,643	+0.80%
2012	1,706	+0.76%
2017	1,780	+0.85%
2023	1,905	+1.14%
Source: INSEE

== Places and monuments ==
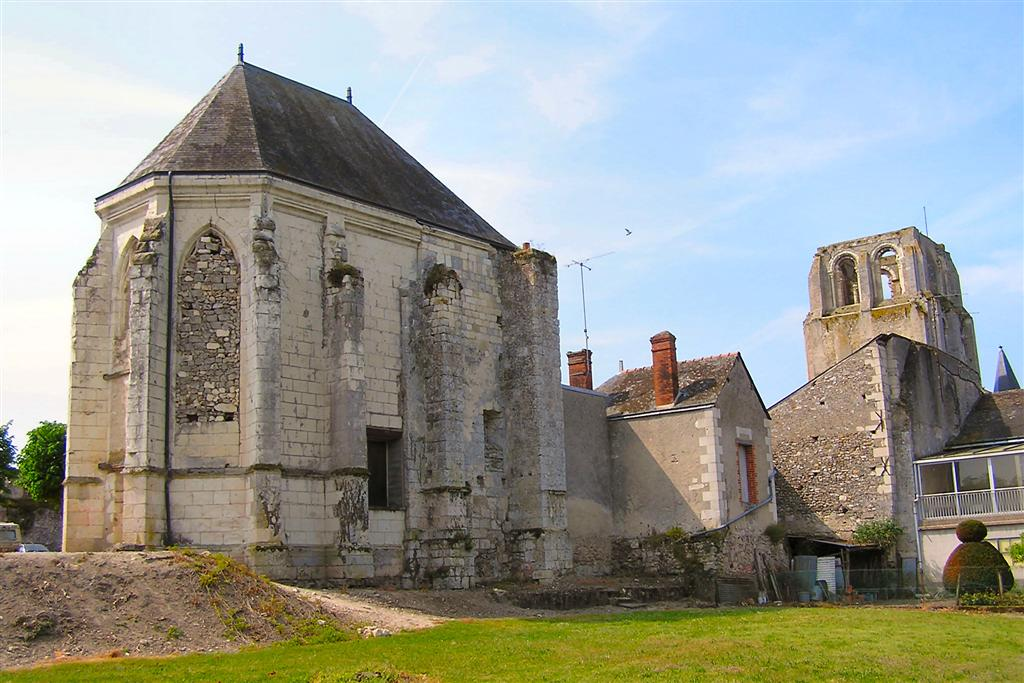
Ruins of the Abbey

- A lantern of the dead from the twelfth century. Declared a historical monument on 1 December 1920 as a lantern of the dead. (It seems that this is actually a hosanna cross).
- Benedictine abbey: founded in 791 by Ithier, abbot of Saint Martin of Tours
- The Chapel of the Virgin: Built at the end of the 15th century.
- The rectory: Built in the 15th century.

== Personalities linked to the town ==
- Ithier of Saint Martin
- Paul Boyer (slavist) (1864–1949), was born in Cormery

== Bibliography ==
- Engerand, Roland (1947). Cormery, bourg tourangeau, photographies de Sylvain Knecht [Cormery, town of Touraine, Photographs of Synvain Knect] (in French). Éditions Plaisirs de France.

== See also ==
- Communes of the Indre-et-Loire department
