= Louroux Priory =

Priory in France

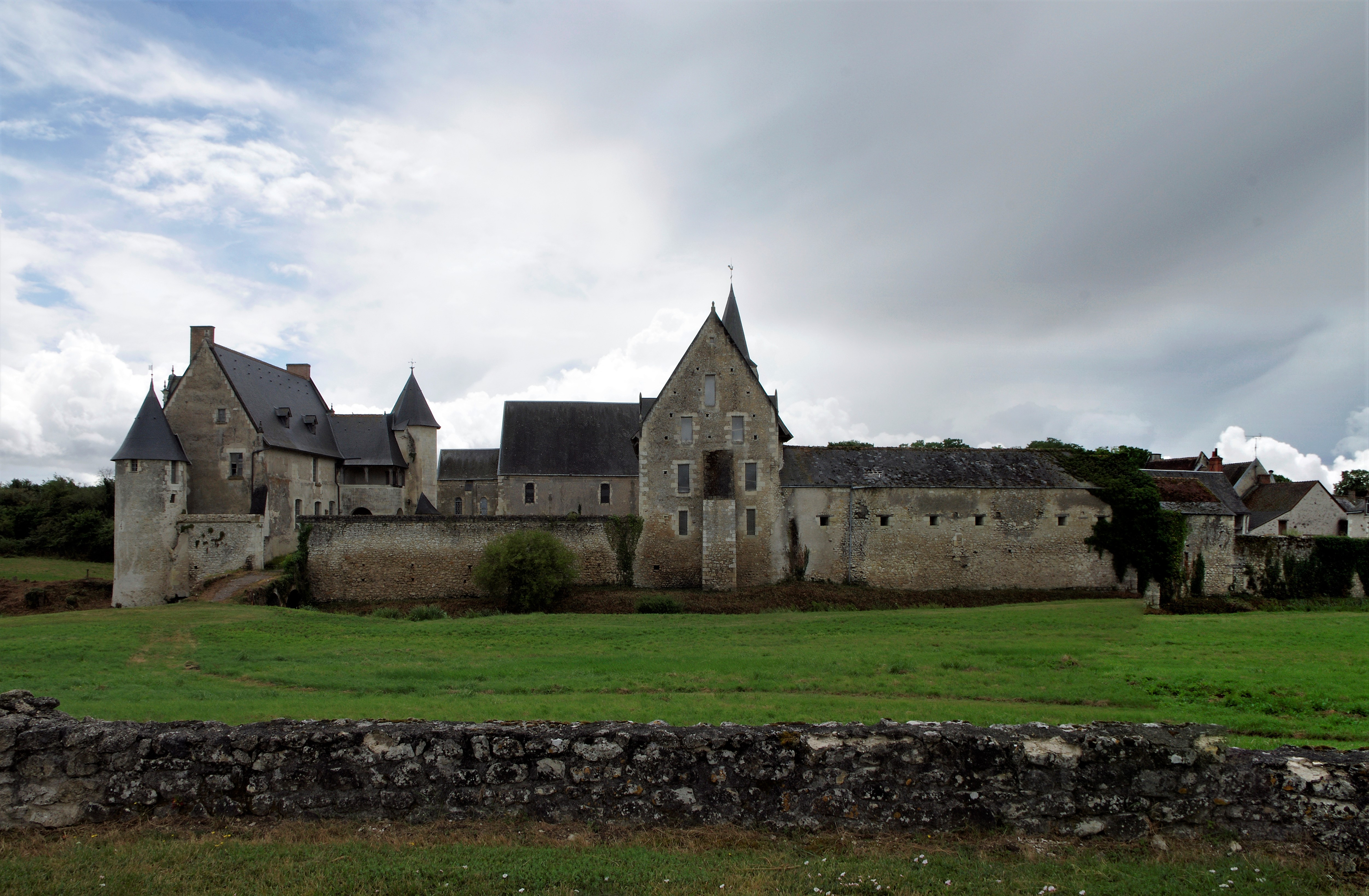
- Overview of the Louroux Priory.
- Interactive map of the Louroux Priory area

General information
- Type: Priory
- Architectural style: Romanesque architecture, Gothic, French Renaissance, Classical architecture
- Location: Le Louroux commune, Loches arrondissement, Indre-et-Loire department, Centre-Val de Loire region., France
- Coordinates: 47°09′38″N 0°47′13″E
- Inaugurated: 1058 A.C.
- Owner: Marmoutier Abbey, Tours

Design and construction
- Awards: Monument historique (1973, church) Monument historique (1975, dovecote, elevations, façade and roof)
- Designations: Belongs to the Benedictines order

Website
- https://www.lelouroux.com/

The Louroux Priory, also known as Château du Louroux, is located in the commune of Louroux in the French department of Indre-et-Loire, Centre-Val de Loire region. It was founded in the 12th century by the Marmoutier Abbey. At the time, the Benedictine monastery was one of nine priories belonging to the Touraine abbacy and located in the Tours diocese.

The buildings, constructed between the 11th and 20th centuries, are surrounded by an enclosure and a fortified wall from the Feudal period, with a drawbridge and a standing bridge. Dating from the Romanesque, Gothic, Renaissance, and Classical eras, the complex includes several buildings, most notably the Prior's Residence, two barns, a dovecote, and a church dedicated to Saint Sulpice. The priory also included a Romanesque building, probably a "Grande Salle", built in the Middle Ages, of which only vestiges remain.

Towards the mid-16th century, with the beginning of the commendam regime within Marmoutier Abbey, the priory was transformed into an agricultural establishment, then came under the administration of the Archbishopric of Tours in the mid-18th century. Leased to farmers, the former priory and its estate were sold as national property in 1791.

The church was listed in 1973. The dovecote, façades, and roofs of the feudal farm buildings were listed on the general inventory in 1975.

The Louroux priory, which has been the subject of numerous restoration campaigns undertaken by the abbots of Marmoutier, was restored in the 2000s.

== Geography ==
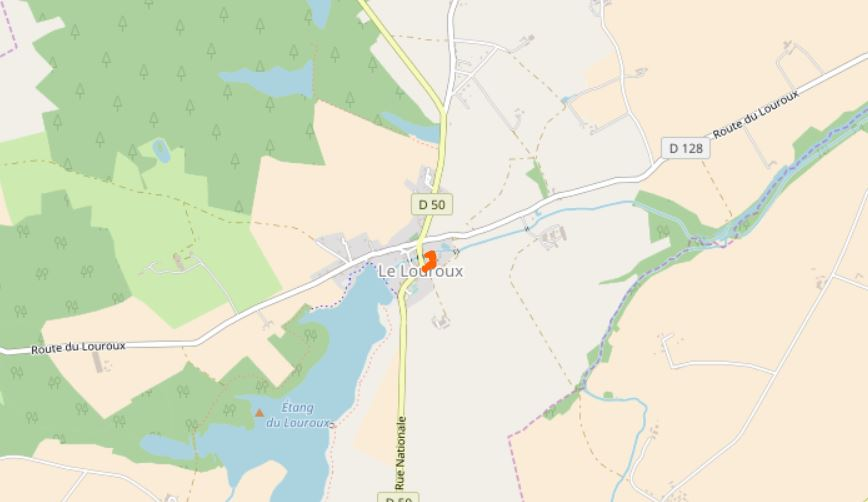
OpenStreetMap location of the priory (orange dot in the center of the map)

The Louroux priory, also known as "Château du Louroux", is located east of the main center of Le Louroux, a commune in the arrondissement of Loches, department of Indre-et-Loire, in the Centre-Val de Loire region. To the northeast of Le Louroux stands the former commune of Saint-Bauld, a parish founded at the same time as the priory. (Note: The Saint-Bauld parish territory is the result of land consolidation in Le Louroux after the 4th century AD.) The fief of Armançay, or Armençey, straddles the communes of Tauxigny-Saint-Bauld and Le Louroux, where Hardouin V de Maillé had a manor house towards the late 13th century, and which was later elevated to a castellany. The commune of Manthelan, situated on a south-southeast axis, was probably the center of a vicus, a small settlement dating from the 5th century BC.

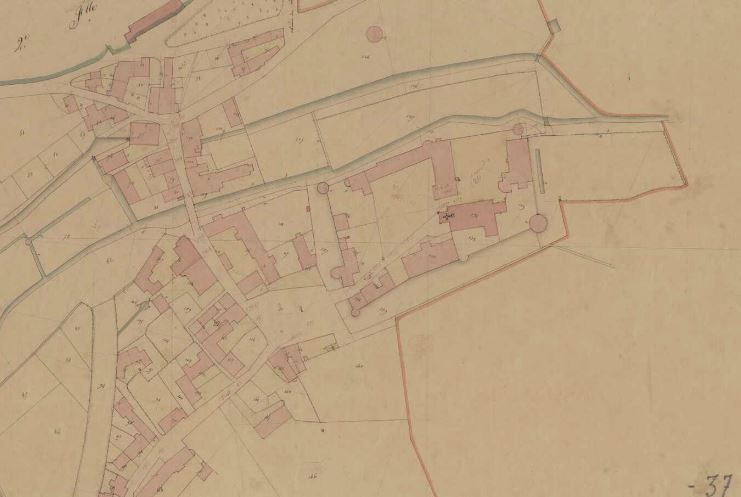
The priory buildings on the 1832 Napoleonic cadastral plan of Le Louroux.

The fortified complex is bordered by the Route de Louroux to the north and the Route Départementale 50 to the west. The Rue du Château, which starts in the south-west, provides access to the priory's enclosure. The priory's northern boundary is delimited by a stream of the Échandon, a tributary of the Indre, which feeds the Louroux ponds to the southwest of the commune's main square. This watercourse, which forms part of the moat of the fortified complex, separates it from the town center to the west. The Échandon serves as a border, a type of demarcation specific to the Loch region during the Middle Ages.

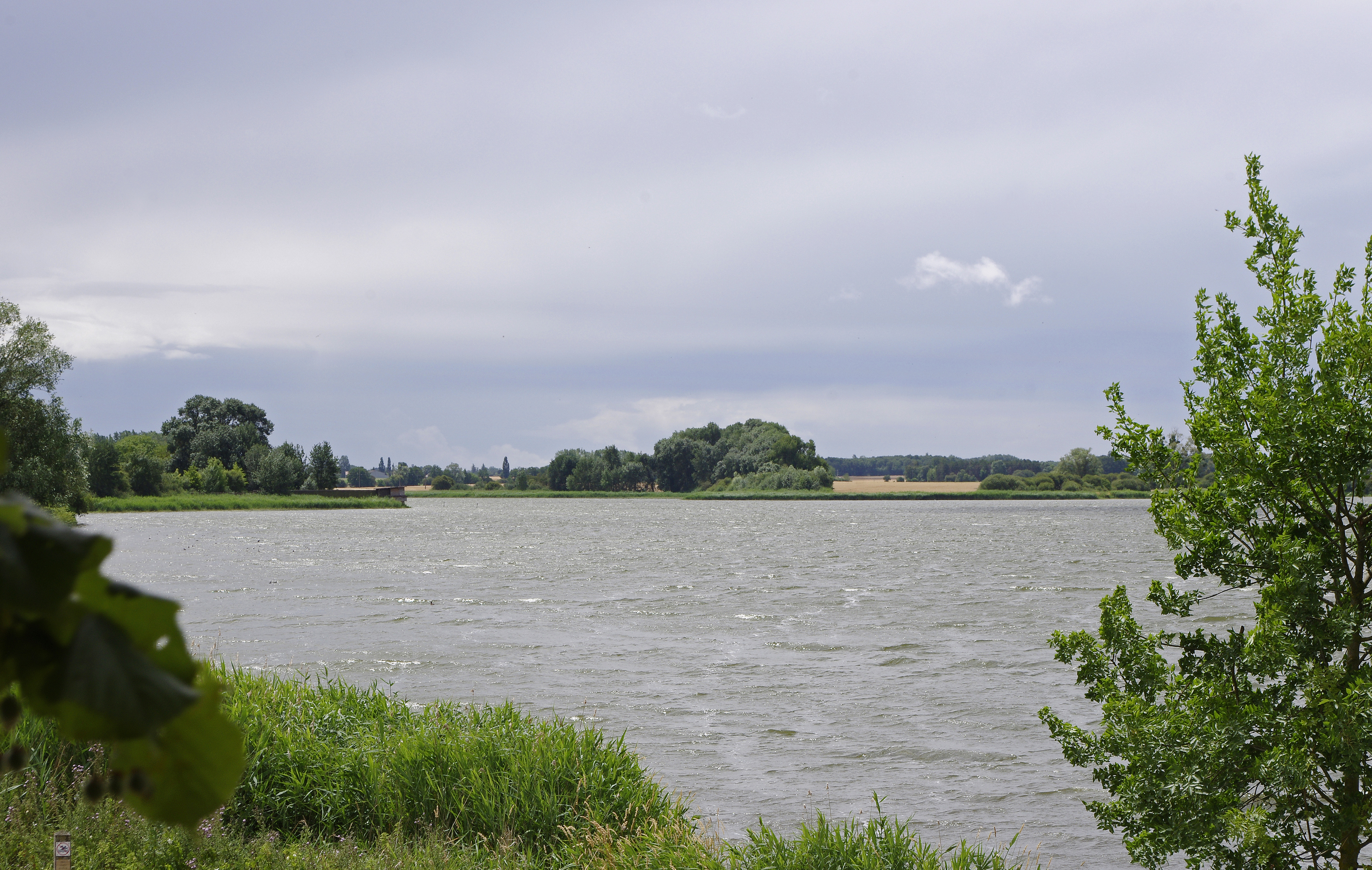
The Louroux ponds.

The Louroux ponds, comprising two bodies of water -the 52-hectare Etang des Roseaux and the 4-hectare Etang de Beaulieu- (Note: These complex bodies of water make up the largest pond in the Indre-et-Loire region.) were created in the 10th and 11th centuries respectively and exploited by the monks of the priory. Not far from the ponds, in a place called "Mazère" (lieu-dit), a Gallo-Roman villa was discovered in 1976. From this 100 x 100 m ancient settlement, only remains traces that were identifiable by aerial survey.

The fortified complex, which lies at the heart of a small valley, is flanked on the south by a plateau, which rises to a modest altitude. The Louroux priory, like the rest of the commune, rests on a subsoil largely made up of yellow limestone formed in the Turonian period, as well as siliceous clay and lacustrine limestone formed in the Senonian period.

After its foundation, the Le Louroux monastery became one of nine priories belonging to the Marmoutier abbey in the Tours diocese.

== History ==
=== Middle Age ===
==== Foundation ====
In 993, the Archbishop of Tours, Archembault de Sully, made a donation of the Saint-Sulpice church (or, more precisely, of an oratory) to the monks of the Marmoutier abbey – the toponym Louroux comes from the Latin word oratorium and literally means oratory, "place of prayer". This deed is the oldest manuscript document relating to Louroux. The Louroux church was then ceded as an ecclesiastic benefice in return of an annual income (or cens) of ten sous. This annual remuneration came to an end under the ministry of Raoul II, towards the late 11th and early 12th centuries.

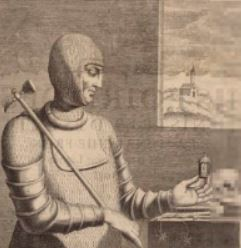
Geoffrey II, Count of Anjou

The foundation of the priory was most probably simultaneous with the creation of the parishes of the Louroux and Saint-Bault. However, as with the eighteen other priories erected in Touraine by the abbacy of Marmoutier, there is no trace of a foundational deed for the Louroux. According to Jacques-Xavier Carré de Busserolle, the Louroux Priory was founded in 1058 by Geoffrey of Anjou. (Note: Concerning the Count of Anjou who founded the priory, Carré de Busserolle mentions Geoffroy III d'Anjou, known as "Barbu" (a reference taken up by André Montoux), who succeeded Geoffroy II d'Anjou, known as "Martel", only on his death on 14 November 1060. Impey and Lorans, countering the archaeologist's position, point out: "[...] J.X. Carré de Busserolle, who sees Count Geoffroy Martel as the founder of the priory in 1058".) At the time of its foundation, the Louroux's establishment was the seat of a castellany held by the abbey of Marmoutier, whose ruler possessed "the titles and prerogatives of lord of Louroux with the rights of high, medium and low justice". However, as Edward Impey and Élisabeth Lorans point out, there are no documents attesting to the foundation of the Louroux by the Count of Anjou. However, charters of donation, issued in the 11th and 12th centuries, enable us to reconstruct the increase in seigniorial and religious rights at the Louroux. These documents show that during this period, Geoffroy II d'Anjou, as well as the lords close to him, contributed to the priory's development.

==== The priory's first buildings and development ====
The very first mention of the priory appears in a 1052 donation charter issued by Goscelin de Sainte-Maure. The lord of Sainte-Maure agreed to cede to the monks of the Louroux the right to bread-making, (Note: In the charter, the Latin terms used to designate this custom are: pasgnagium vel pasquerium.) with the exception of those who had long owed him the privilege of doing so. This donation was executed before 15 August 1052, the date of Goscelin de Sainte-Maure's death.

During the 11th century, Montbazon appears in acts relating to the priory. The monks of the Louroux, who belong to the Benedictine order, have held land at Lavatorii (fief du Lavoir, commune of Veigné) from their Tenant-in-chief Thibault de Braord, knight of Montbazon, since the foundation of the monastic establishment, in exchange for an annual cens of 200 denarius. (Note: In 991, Archambault Sully, Archbishop of Tours, donated land belonging to Le Lavoir to Marmoutier Abbey, together with a mill and a meadow.) On Braord's death, his wife Audierne demanded one setier of wheat and 4 setiers of wine in addition to the cens. The monks refused, the dispute was brought before the court of Montbazon and Braord's widow's claim was rejected.

The Ulgers, another seigneurial family than the Sainte-Maure, are also linked to the priory's history. Relations between the priory and this family date back to the first half of the 11th century. An undated charter shows that Archembault and Ulger, two of the sons of Ulger, doyen of Saint-Martin, renounced "all uses and royalties whatsoever that their father Ulger possessed on the lands of the said religious called Louroux". This deed is associated with an acknowledgment on Marmoutier's part of Geoffroy de Montbazon's possessions in the Louroux Viguerie, which were later annulled before the court of Montbazon in return for a payment of 15 livres. A second document, dated 1064, mentions Dean Ulger and his son ceding the customs and collections on the Louroux estate. In February 1067, Geoffroy, the youngest son of doyen Ulger, in return for 100 sous, paid by Barthélémy, abbot of Marmoutier, ceded his rights of use and custom over the Louroux Priory.

During Barthélémy's abbacy, between 1064 and 1084, an individual named Ainard de Sainte-Maure (Note: Although bearing the Sainte-Maure surname, he does not belong to this Touraine family.) donated ten serfs from the Louroux parish. Towards the late 12th century, between 1080 and 1100, his son Hugues de Sainte-Maure sought to obtain half the tithe and agistment rights belonging to the priory of Le Louroux. Ardonius, the prior in charge of Le Louroux at the time, did not give in to his demands; the dispute was settled through a duel, and Sainte-Maure's attempt failed. (Note: The document relating to this event does not bear a precise date.)

The first buildings to be erected, the Prior's residence and the Church of Saint-Sulpice, date back to the 12th century. The oldest building is probably the one used to house the prior. According to André Montoux, the church dedicated to Saint Sulpice, donated in the early 990s, was entirely rebuilt at the end of the 12th century. Archaeologist Robert Ranjard, on the other hand, believes that the current nave was constructed in the 13th century. Other archaeologists, Elisabeth Lorans and Edward Impey, corroborate this claim. In 1146, an individual named Hugues Ancipitrencis sold six acres of land located "near the Gaultier elm" ("juxta ulnum Gaulterii") to the monks of Louroux. A sum of 30 sous, plus an annual fee of six deniers, were paid in return. A dispute arose between the priory of Le Louroux and that of Saint-Bauld between 1180 and 1188, concerning the tithe levied on the fief of Armançay – then known by its Latinized toponym Hermentiaci. The disagreement over the levying of Armançay, an estate located on the border between Tauxigny-Saint-Bauld and Le Louroux, resulted in the official materialization of the border between the two parishes.

==== Fortification ====
From 1210 to 1220, (Note: Jacques-Xavier Carré de Busserolle gives a precise date: 1222.) according to the Marmoutier charters, Hugues des Roches, who was abbot of the Marmoutier Abbey, at the time, may have been responsible for building the aula (main hall), refurbishing the residence, building a barn, and fortifying the site. Within the Grande chronique de Touraine d'André Salmon, the following text refers to these events:

« Sextus decimus abbas fuit Hugo [...] In Lavatorio ipse fecit fierimagna œdificia et plurimos reditus acquisivit, et in Lavatorio hic œdificavit aulam et grangiam et vetera œdificia reparavit, et muris cinxit totum manerium. (Hugues was the sixteenth abbot [...] At the Louroux, he himself enlarged the dwelling and enriched it with numerous revenues, and at the Louroux, he built a large hall and a barn and repaired the old dwelling, and surrounded the entire manor with a wall). » — André Salmon, 1854, p. 325.

Nonetheless, attributing this construction to the initiative of the abbot of Marmoutier needs to be nuanced: according to Impey and Lorans, it is not impossible that this was an older building that Des Roches only had repaired, and that this same aula was destroyed at a later date.

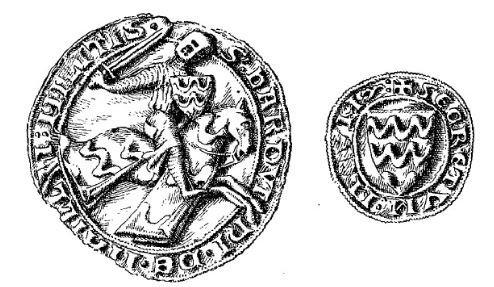
Seal and counter-seal of Hardouin V de Maillé.

In 1221, a knight named Geoffroy Isoré donated one-third of two acres of meadow to the priory. This land is close to the mill ceded in 991 by Archbishop Archembault Sully. Towards the end of the 13th century, in a deed dated 5 May 1287, Hardouin V de Maillé and his wife Jeanne de Beauçay, then owners of a manor in the Louroux section of Armançay, relinquished all breading, smoking preservation and cornage rights they held over the Louroux monks. Around 1251, on behalf of the priory, the monks of Marmoutier purchased a millstream and mill site in the Louroux parish. Then, in 1302, a knight and lord of Blou relinquished his ownership rights to a heath belonging to the parish of the Louroux.

The second phase of construction involved the fortification of the site. This phase probably dates from the early 14th century, rather than from Des Roches' abbatiate in the early 13th century. It involved digging the moat and building the wall.

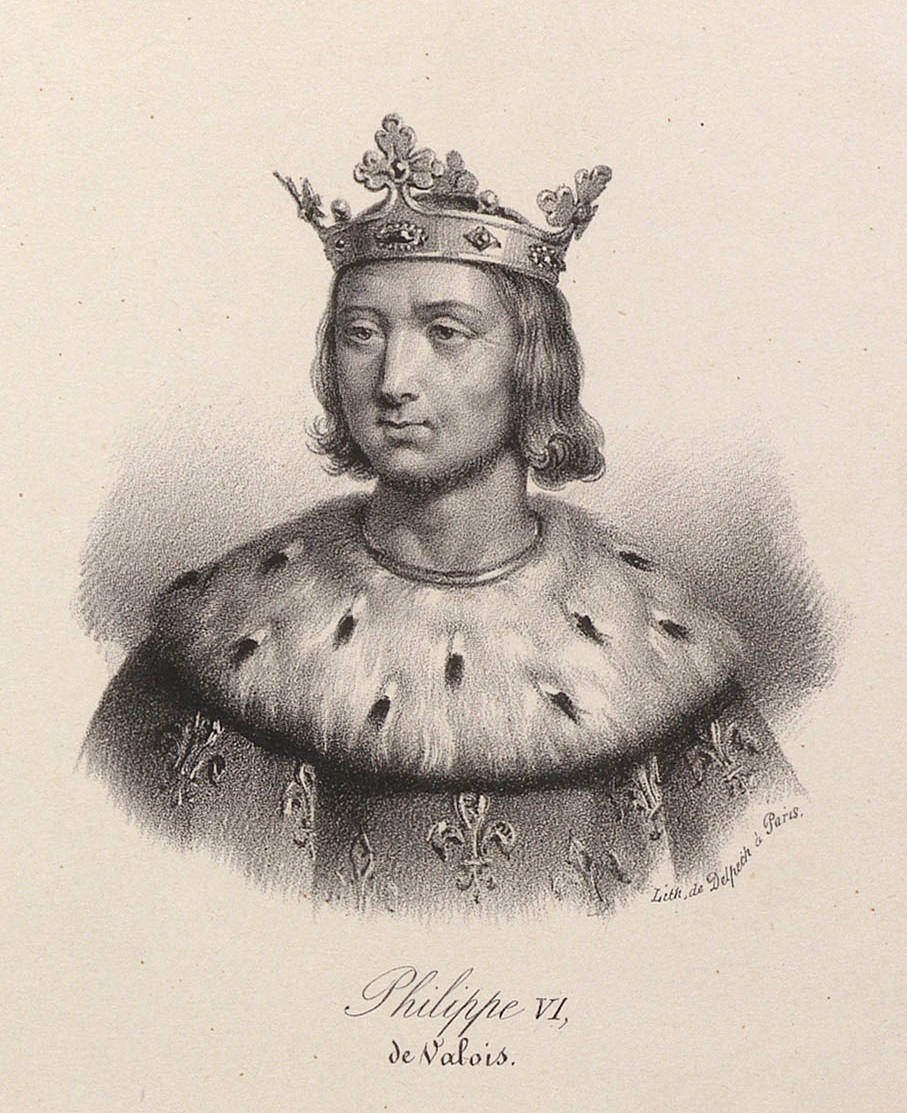
Philippe VI ratified the rights of the seigneur du Louroux in 1334.

The high, medium, and low rights of justice, as well as the setiers of wheat and wine granted to the lord of the Louroux, were made public and ratified by letters patent from King Philippe VI of France in 1334. The monarch of the House of Valois instructed the officers of Montbazon to bring a detainee named Geoffroy before the Louroux jurisdiction.

At the beginning of the 15th century, between 1412 and 1426, Guy I de Lur, then abbot of Marmoutier, purchased a mill and the Roseaux pond, which he transferred to the priory. For the establishment of the Louroux, de Lur also had a new pond built as an extension to that of the Roseaux.

A tithe barn was built in the 15th century. More precisely, a dendrochronological analysis of the various timbers (frame, beam, door and floor) shows that the building was constructed between 1478 and 1479. The fortification of the Louroux complex, comprising the prior's residence, the tithe barn, and the abbey farm, became complete during the Hundred Years' War. Entrance was via a gate in the southwest corner and a postern on the northeast side.

On 14 January 1494, Jean Forheti, at that time a cleric of the diocese of Bourges, agreed to pay the priory's annates. Payment of these taxes, amounting to 36 gold ducats (equivalent to 60 pounds in current currency), were made on behalf of Louis Februarii, then parish priest of the church of Saint-Sulpice, and to the sede vacante of Raoul de La Forge (or de La Forja), a priest of the diocese of Tours, who renounced his diocesan title before the Holy See.

=== Modern period ===
==== Conversion into an abbey farm and Wars of Religion ====
In the early 16th century, Pope Paul II appointed Francesco II Sforza as Abbot of Marmoutier. In addition to the direct benefits due to the abbacy, Sforza shared with his predecessor the revenues generated by the exploitation of the Louroux lands. In 1537, Philippe Hurault succeeded Matthieu Gautier as Abbot of Marmoutier. However, he retained ownership of the Louroux priory, where he died on 15 July 1552, and it is likely that Gautier was the initiator of the renovation work on the priory's residence during the Renaissance. Dendrochronological analysis shows that work on the building dates back to 1520–1523. This involved replacing the timbers, repairing the floor, and remodeling the eastern wall. Hurault, who replaced Gautier in the late 1530s, was the last abbot of the regular clergy regime.

From the second half of the 16th century (or even towards the end of that century), following the replacement of the regular regime by the commendatory regime -this period began in 1540 with the ministry of Jean, Cardinal of Lorraine- the fortified complex no longer had priory status and became a farm under the authority of Marmoutier's Abbey. The lourousian complex then became a "source of income" for Marmoutier and was regularly leased to farmers. The wooded areas included in the priory's domain were sometimes cut down, generating income and financing unexpected expenses.

Early on in 1598, during the Eighth War of Religion, Huguenot troops led by a man named Mussant stormed the priory and damaged the buildings. On 28 and 29 May of the same year, 300 chests piled one on top of the other were removed from the grounds of Saint-Sulpice's church, which had not been maintained for over two decades. (Note: "On the first day of 1598, M. Mussant and his troops lodged at the Louroux and did great damage there. [...] In the latter 1598, peace was made throughout France, and on the 28th and 29th of the said year, three hundred chests were opened, still in the church of Le Louroux.") Given its dilapidated state, Saint-Sulpice's choir area was most likely rebuilt in the course of the 17th century.

==== Repairs and extensions to the archdiocese of Tours ====
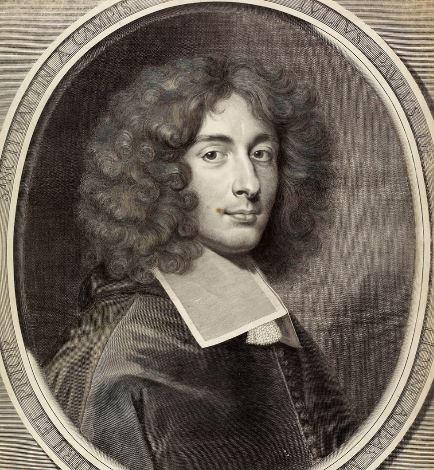
Jules-Paul de Lionne, had the buildings rebuilt in the early 18th century.

On 16 September 1707, the church tower of Saint-Sulpice was destroyed by lightning. The same year, on 8 October, a flood from the Loire caused damage to the buildings at the Louroux. Jules-Paul de Lionne, abbot in charge of Marmoutier's ministry at the time, was authorized to cut down a 250-year-old Louroux high forest behind the priory to cover the cost of reconstruction work. The following year, on 8 October 1708, Joseph Haranc (or Harane), then King's Councillor, Master of Waters and Forests of the Lochois region, and head of the L'Étang's seigneury, was commissioned to select the said grove. De Lionne's campaign is highlighted by an inscription engraved on the lintel of a window in the tithe barn: "Estait fils de Mr de Lionne Ministre d'Estat messire 1712, pavle de Lionne abbé 1712 Marmoutier".

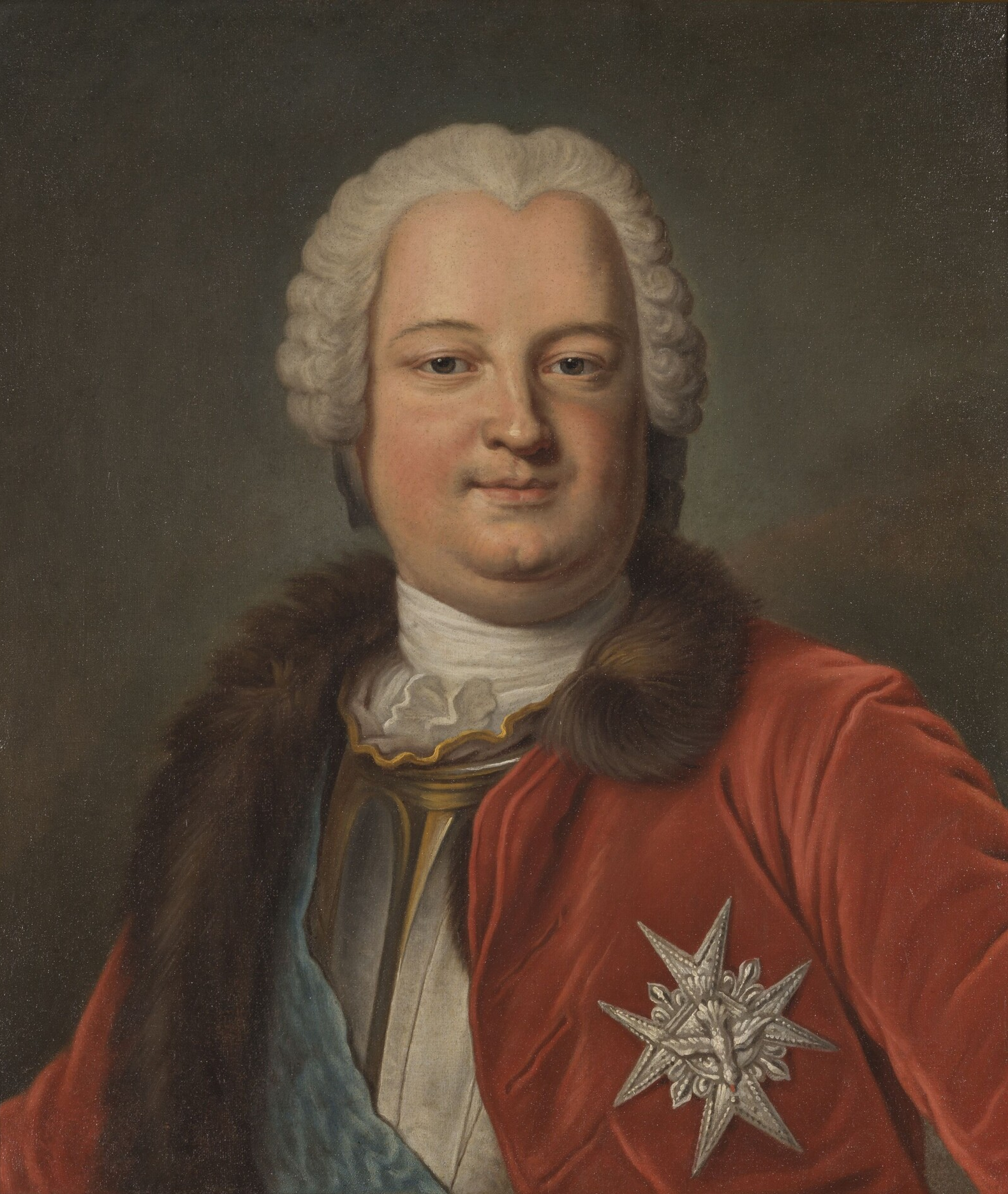
Louis, Count of Clermont had the priory repaired in the first half of the 18th century.

When Louis, Count of Clermont took over as head of Marmoutier, he recognized that the seigneury and "château" of Le Louroux, together with an estate including a park of five to six acres, were the responsibility of the abbey. The park included 600 200-year-old trees, most of which had been decimated. Between 1721 and 1739, during the Bourbon-Condé's abbacy, several works were undertaken. The total cost was 4,447 livres. As early as 1721, Abbé Bourbon-Condé asked the King to allow him to cut down the bicentenary trees to finance the work. On 12 September, Louis XV agreed to this request. A document dated 27 September 1732, shows that repairs to the priory's bridge (referred to as the "château"), a cistern, and various other works were carried out thanks to the adjudication of a 200-hectare oak grove in Louroux. The sale of the oak grove was authorized by Louis XV.

For the Louroux complex, the late 1730s were marked by the merging (or addition) of the episcopal mense of Marmoutier with the Archdiocese of Tours. By 1739, Bourbon-Condé had relinquished his position as abbot. On 11 December, Louis-Jacques Chapt de Rastignac succeeded in bringing Marmoutier's Abbey under the jurisdiction of the diocesan see of Tours, thanks to a papal bull issued by Pope Clement XII. From then on, the priory and its grounds came under the jurisdiction of the Archbishopric of Tours.

The second barn, in classical style, was built between 1750 and 1752.

==== Leases and sales as national property ====
In 1760, the land of the Louroux was leased for 4,200 livres. Then, in 1763, the "seigneury" of the Louroux, which included the priory buildings, four ponds, two tenant farms, tithe revenues, and terraces, was the subject of a "general" lease in return for a total payment of 4,780 livres. The major part of the lease payment was made by a couple for 4,200 livres, with the remainder divided between the parish priest for 500 livres, the bailiff for 50, and the procurator fiscal for 25.

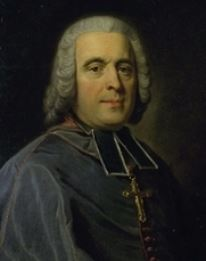
Joachim François Mamert de Conzié, the archbishop who drew up the 1784 lease.

A document from the Touraine archbishopric dated 1774 states that the Louroux land, castellany, and seigneury was leased in 1769 for 4,200 livres. The lease of the Louroux was renewed on 17 November 1784, for a period of nine years, expiring in 1793, and was signed by the archbishop of the time, Joachim François Mamert de Conzié.

A lease signed in 1784 details the real assets that made up the Louroux estate before the revolutionary events. The property consisted of the "château", which included a "turret, fireplace rooms, bakeries and other conveniences, and two courtyards". The first courtyard housed the mews, a vast barn, stables, and a sheepfold with tiled and slate roofs, as well as a vegetable garden "adjacent to and successive to the said château". The deed of the property lease also provides an inventory of the grounds of the Louroux, which include four ponds -Le Grand Etang, covering an area of 200 arpents, Etang de Beaulieu, Etang de Gousset, covering an area of 60 arpents, and Etang de Mauregard- alongside the "métairie de Beauvais". The contractual provisions were rounded out by corvée (forced labour) performed by residents of the lourousian parish, as well as hallage, butchery and cabaret rights. In addition, at the end of the rental contract, farmers are obliged to "leave the dovecote properly and densely populated with sixty dozen pigeons". They are also obliged to provide food and lodging for the Intendant of Marmoutier and his servant when he stays at the Louroux, and for the Bailli on court days. The contract specifies that tenants cannot claim compensation in the event of hail, flood, or drought. In addition, the annual rental price is set at 4,200 livres, which can be paid in two instalments.

In 1790, revenues generated by the priory and all its tenant farms were valued at 6,600 livres. However, the priory and its estate were seized as national property, and on 1 December, a first offer was made to buy it. However, it wasn't until 2 May 1791, that the Louroux estate was sold. The sale price was set at 56,000 livres, plus 16,200 livres in payment for the Beauvais tenant farm.

=== Contemporary period ===
==== Succession of private ownership ====
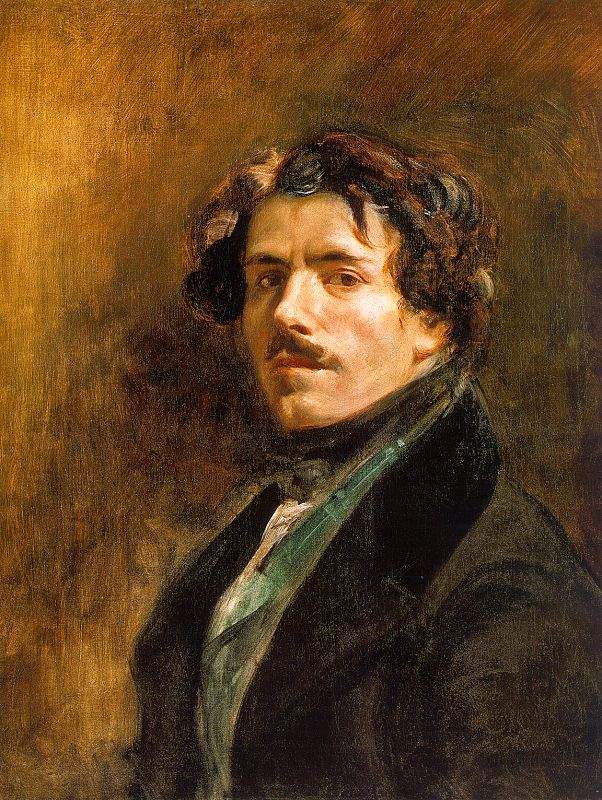
Painter Eugène Delacroix sketched the priory.

The purchaser of the Louroux estate, Robert Godeau, a citizen of Loches and "premier suppléant au tribunal" and "inspecteur des eaux et des forêts", paid in several installments, the last of which was dated 7 prairial An III (26 May 1795, in the Gregorian calendar).

In the early 1820s, the painter Eugène Delacroix began to make several visits to the Louroux, to visit his brother Charles-Henri Delacroix, who owned a country house there. (Note: Charles-Henri Delacroix's house is located on the road to Manthelan.) During one of his visits, Delacroix drew a sketch of the priory, the only known iconography of the fortified complex.

When Godeau died on 17 March 1842, his eldest son and daughter inherited the lourousien estate. The two Godeau children entered into a transaction in 1861, selling the Louroux estate in exchange for a tenant farm located astride the communes of Sainte-Catherine-de-Fierbois and Saint-Épain. In addition to the priory buildings, the Louroux estate comprised the Beauvais tenant farm and four ponds, covering a total surface area of 217 ha.

Jules Mourruau became the owner of the priory and its estate in 1913, following a donation-partage agreement signed on 22 December. The Mourruau family still owned the lourousian complex in the 1970s.

==== Heritage protection and restoration campaign ====
The fortified site, in particular the logis prieural, was used as a set for the filming of Mauregard, (Note: The "Beauregard farm" owned by Maxence turns out to be the prior's residence, the façade of which can be seen in episode no. 2 of Mauregard. An aerial view of the Touraine monastery can also be seen in the credits at the end of each episode.) a mini-series directed by Claude de Givray.

On 19 December 1973, via ministerial decree, the church of Saint-Sulpice was listed on the Inventaire supplémentaire des monuments historiques (supplementary inventory of historic monuments). A year and a half later, on 20 May 1975, it was the turn of the dovecote, as well as the façades and roofs of the feudal farm buildings, to be listed on the general inventory.

External image
- L'azur en pré fleurit, on the website: http://www.yvescharnay.com/29-lazur-en-pre-fleurit.html

In the first half of the 1990s, the town council acquired the abbey farm's buildings and the adjoining estate. In August 2002, artist Yves Charnay created a plastic arts light display at the priory, entitled L'azur en pré fleurit. Two years later, on 31 December 2004, the last tenant farmer left the priory. The following year, in 2005, the Communauté de communes du Grand Ligueillois initiated a campaign to restore the structures. The restoration campaign was carried out in two phases. The whole project was spread over a four-year period. The restoration work was led by Arnaud de Saint-Jouan, chief architect for historic monuments. The first phase began in July 2007 and was completed in December 2008. This first phase focused on the restoration of the Gothic barn, certain elements of the priory's residence, and the barn, as well as the restoration of the perimeter wall, under the auspices of an association governed by the French law of 1901.

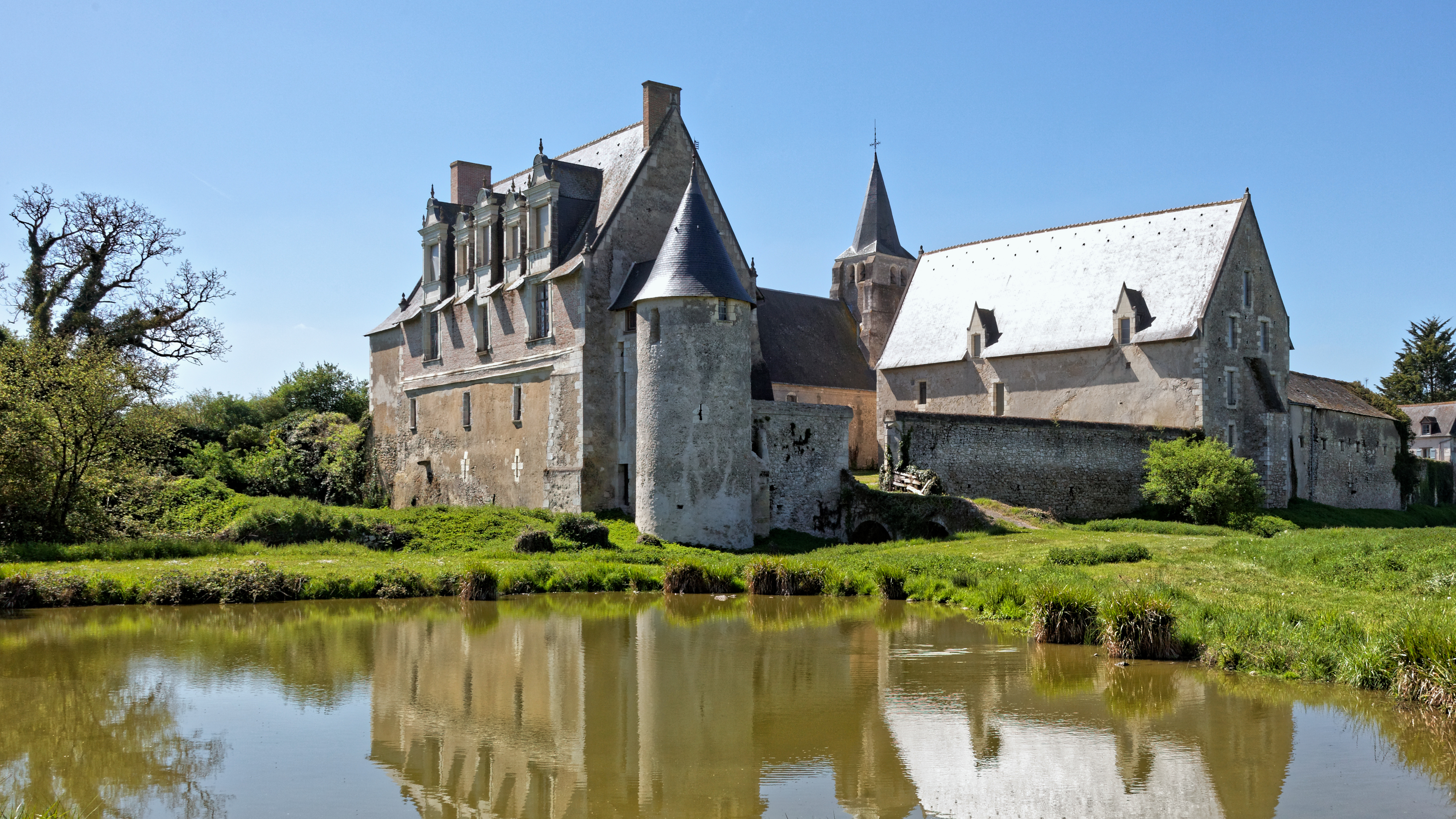
The priory, in 2017.

The development of the monastery buildings into a "local tourism hub" was envisaged for 2012. And in 2013, as part of the cultural, heritage and town-planning development of the Louroux, the Communauté de communes du Grand Ligueillois' tourism commission, launched a new project for the former priory buildings. The project consisted of housing the conservatory of clerical vestments in the barn; setting up a research and documentation center, a conference room, and permanent exhibitions in the barn built in the 15th century; as well as setting up an artistic residence and permanent exhibitions in the prior's residence; with the classical-era barn and inner courtyard dedicated to theatrical and other cultural events. The project also includes the installation of a botanical greenhouse for local species in the garden and kitchen garden adjoining the former lourousian fortified complex.

The turret was restored in the mid-2010s. And, in July 2015, (Note: Regarding the restoration work on the prieural residence's turret, the vice-president of the Communauté de communes du Grand Ligueillois explains: "The façade was modified in modern times, and it has been possible to restore the original openings from the surviving elements. It is therefore proposed to carry out additional work to complete a definitive exterior restoration in the spirit of the 15th century".) the Communauté de Communes voted to refurbish the building. Work on the small tower included replacing the wall plates, restoring the rafters and repairing the mortise and tenon joints.

The priory, which "offers a complex architectural evolution from the 12th – 13th centuries to the 19th century", has a "little-known building history". However, recent dendrochronological studies of timber and joinery have made it possible to date the buildings of the Touraine monastery. Restoration and rehabilitation work in the 2000s helped to safeguard this "monument to multiple architectures". In the 2010s, the Louroux priory opened up to tourism, specifically in June 2013, during an agricultural festival, where the Louroux complex welcomed around 1,300 visitors, and in June 2015 several themed guided tours were organized there, followed by an arts festival in September 2017.

== Buildings and structures ==
=== Overview ===
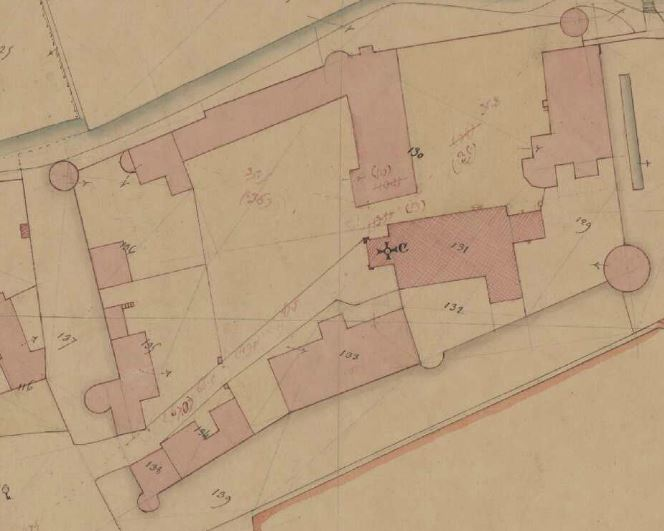
Ground plan of the buildings in 1832 (with the exception of the dovecote, further north).

Stages in the construction of the priory's main buildings 12th century Early 13th century Late 14th century Late 15th century Mid-16th century Early 17th century Late 17th century 1710 From the 19th to the 20th century Restored route

The priory stands like a "fortress" on a north-east/south-west axis. Surrounded by a fortified wall, its moat is irrigated by water from the Louroux ponds. The site is characterized by a 3 m difference in elevation: the highest point is at the entrance to the church, while the lowest point is at the standing bridge on the northern side. The surrounding wall, including curtain walls and turrets, has an enclosed area of over 5,500 m^{2} – 5,600 m^{2} according to calculations by Élisabeth Lorans and Edward Impey, and 5,700 m^{2} according to Arnaud de Saint-Jouan. The courtyard of the residence, on the east side, covers an area of 2,500 m^{2}, while the forecourt, on the west side, covers an area of 3,700 m^{2}. At the time of the purchase in the early 1910s, all the land included in the priory property covered a total area of around 200 hectares or 230 hectares, and the estate occupied an area of 2,000 hectares.

The dovecote is located outside the fortified enclosure, to the north, on the other side of the Echandon River, within a garden. It is surrounded to the north, east, and west by the remains of a garden fence. Inside the wall, the tithe barn and outbuildings occupy a central position, with the church nearby. All the buildings are arranged around a courtyard bordered to the south by the church. The prior's residence, to the northeast, runs parallel to the barn, dividing the inner courtyard into two parts. Between the residence and the church stood a Romanesque building, of which only a few vestiges remain.

The livestock buildings are located to the north of the forecourt, opposed by the second, or "classical", barn in the southern part. The 3 to 5 m gap between the southern part of the tithe barn and the western part of the church allows passage from the courtyard to the forecourt.

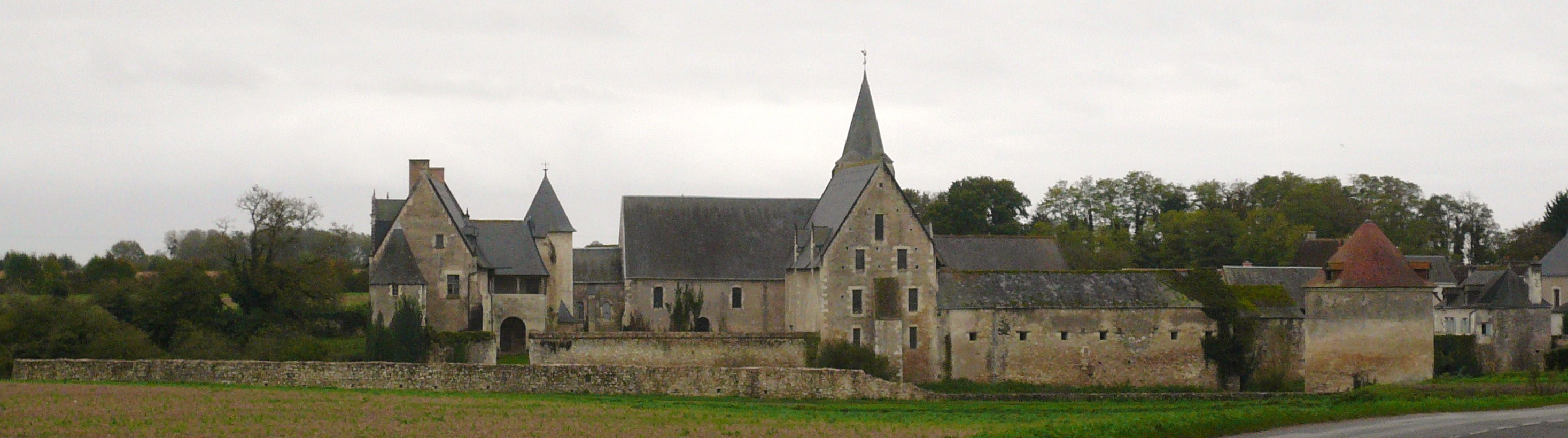
Overview of the complex.

=== The Prior's residence ===
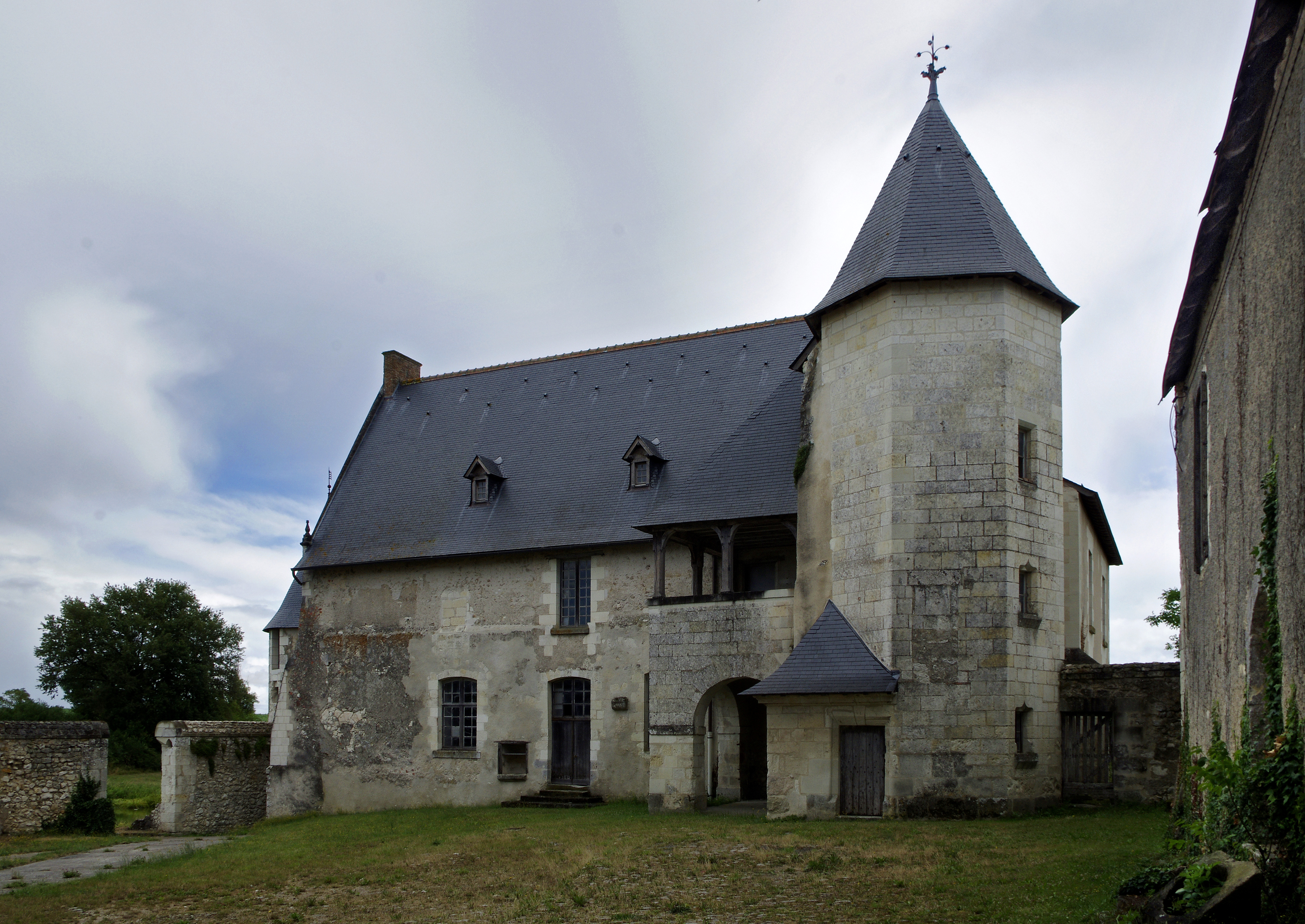
The residence from the west side.

The residence consists of a main building with a rectangular design. The building is set between two "rondelis" (or ramp) gable walls whose sides form an acute angle. A finial sits atop one of the two gable walls. The architectural style of the residence is that of a "traditional Touraine manor house". In addition to the rondelis gables, the building features an ashlar-dressed spiral staircase (attached to the main building) facing west, and chimney flues rising high above the roof on the south side. The residence is linked to the northeast enclosure turret by a main building featuring a short gallery on the second floor. This gallery ends in a lincrusted vault with flashings that resemble branches.

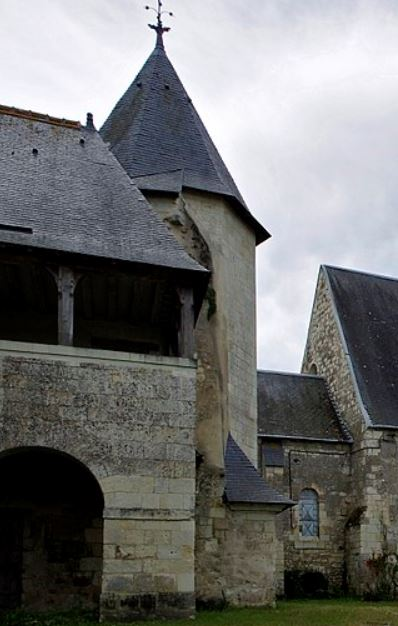
Polygonal tower and gallery.

The spiral staircase takes the form of a polygonal tower with ashlar dressings. The tower, built during the 15th century, is pierced by three rectangular openings, two of which are located on the lower floors and feature an ogee arch. One of its sides forms a base for the west-facing wall. A column, topped by an eight-sided capital and supported by the staircase newel, supports a ceiling made of large slabs. Access to the polygonal tower is via a door framed by a rectilinear lintel. This entrance is set within a forebay aedicula topped by a triangular gable roof. The tower and main body are connected by a rectangular gallery (or open terrace). The gallery consists of a wooden frame resting on a wall pierced by two semicircular arches, with protruding sommiers. The architectural style of the arches is typical of the 16th and 17th centuries, while the carpentry of this loggia is made up of posts and joists that, according to dendrochronological dating, were cut down around the middle of the 15th century (between 1440 and 1462). The chronological difference between the carpentry and the masonry can only be explained in two ways: either the gallery was re-worked during the 16th and 17th centuries, or the carpentry elements were re-used.

The basement houses a cellar with arches located on the east side. It features massive beams to support the floor weight. The cellar of the residence is connected to two other cellars, with vaulted ceilings on wooden beams, dug out below the courtyard. The passageway between the basement of the dwelling and the two courtyard cellars is provided by a staircase to the west, consisting of just a few steps. The two cellars, which form a right angle, feature a semicircular vault in the first cellar and a pointed arch vault in the second. As a result of the building's many construction projects, its masonry is quite heterogeneous. The east-facing facade, overlooking the moat, features a consistent, homogeneous architectural style. It is fitted with Renaissance-style dormer windows.

Towards the end of the 19th century, the upper section of the building is said to have suffered a fire. (Note: This event was recorded by a man named Reverdiau, whose family owned the property at the time.) However, studies of the masonry structures and structural beams revealed no evidence of this event. Instead, an extensive restoration campaign was carried out on the building in the early 20th century. Most of the work was focused on the façade walls and the attic. When the scaffolding was set up against the thick, trapezoidal east wall, the poor condition of its brickwork and the dormer windows that top it were revealed. In addition, behind the brickwork on the upper level, the project revealed a wall consisting of timber framing with steeply sloping overhangs. (Note: This type of layout, very rarely documented in Indre-et-Loire, is also found on the façade of the Bourdigal manor in Monnaie, and to a lesser extent on the Saint-Épain provost's house.) The carpentry work is supported by overhanging eaves, combined with a molded ashlar entablature. At an undetermined date, this carpentry work, which was in a state of considerable rot at the time, was entirely preserved, then covered with brick cladding. On the first level, the façade is illuminated by 3 windows, the central one of which has been redesigned and is significantly narrower than the other two. Remains of transoms indicate that the left and right windows were once equipped with mullions. However, the pilasters with capitals adorning these two windows are still in place. The eastern façade features 5 Renaissance-style stone dormers. Each dormer is topped by a pinnacled pediment and adorned with a terracotta candelabra on its side. Prior to this, at the beginning of the 20th century, only two wooden dormers crowned the east façade.

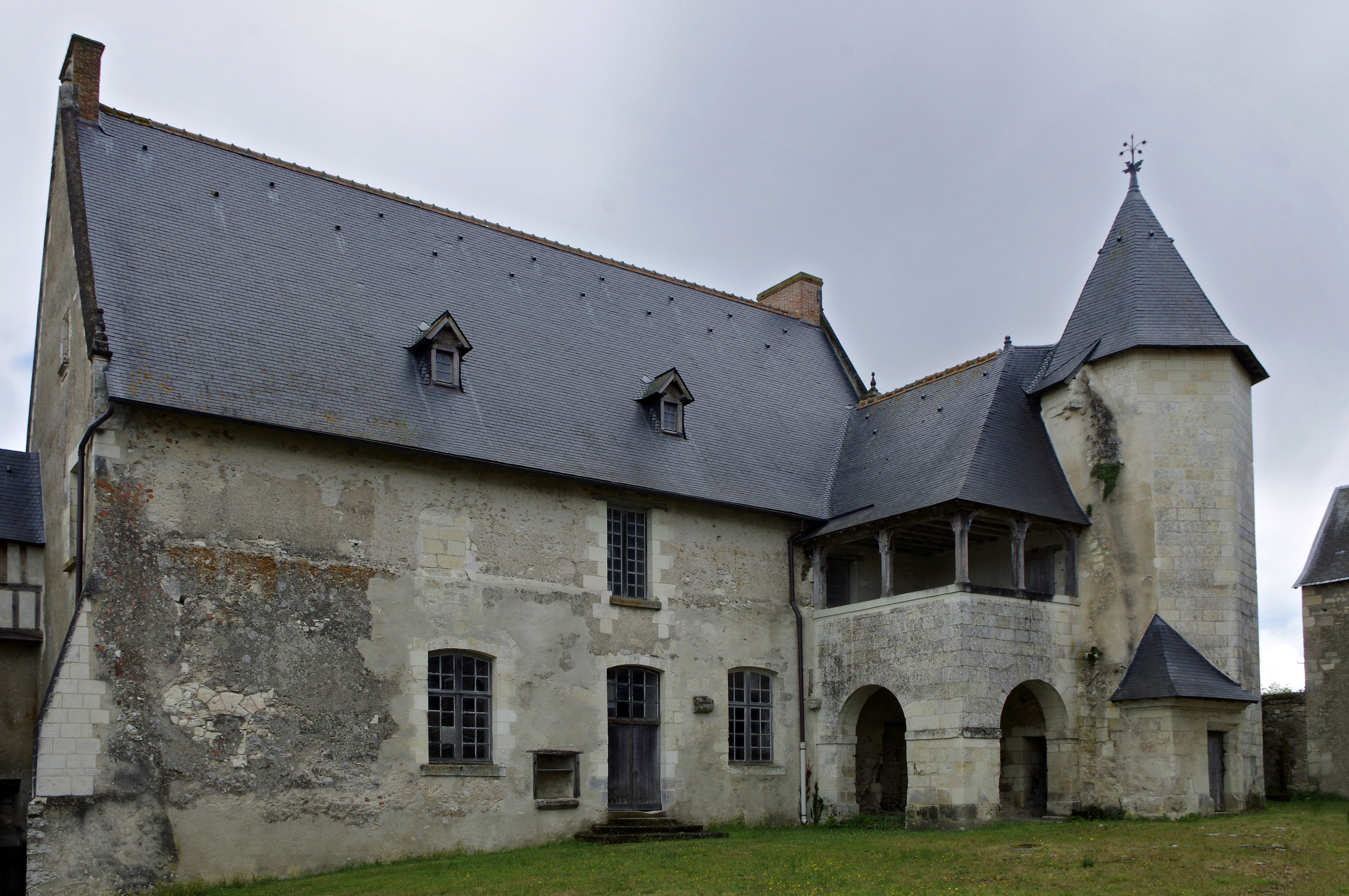
West façade, gallery and polygonal tower.

The residence is the building with the oldest visible masonry structures. This is most apparent on the west side, where the walls are adorned with windows with semicircular arches. A corner buttress supports the extension of the west façade. The western façade, whose second floor is noticeably set back from the first floor, has been altered several times. The roof of the residence rests on a herringbone-patterned rafter framework, whose beams, each numbered in ascending order from north to south, are derived from trees cut down in 1519. The wood from the planks on the first and second floors comes from trees cut in 1522. In addition, dendrochronological expertise shows that the timber elements making up the paneling on the east façade were cut during the same period, i.e. in 1520. Although some of the original masonry (11th century) has been preserved, these results show that the residence was almost completely rebuilt during the Renaissance.

=== Lost Romanesque building ===
A Romanesque building, no longer in existence, once complimented the west façade of the prieural dwelling. Several elements attest to the existence of this ancient structure.

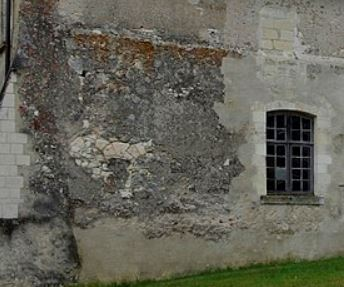
Close-up of the wall and former bays of the Romanesque building.

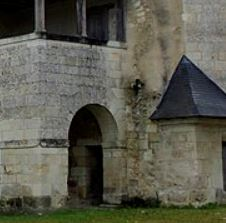
Close-up of the wall being rebuilt where the old Romanesque openings used to be (here: at the corner of the polygonal tower).

The first is a section of wall running east–west. This thick remnant extends northwest of the residence. The second element is the presence of two typically Romanesque buttresses that support the northwest corner of the main building. The third element is a Romanesque double-arched openings, approximately 2.50 m high and located to the left of the double buttress, the study of which revealed that its embrasure had been altered. This alteration consisted of narrowing the opening to the same thickness as the wall. This opening, later partitioned, may have been fitted with a second embrasure.

Other clues attest to the existence of this Romanesque building: the presence of voussoirs, traces of which can still be seen near the entrance to the residence, as well as a little further north, the latter possibly suggesting the construction of a doorway that was later blocked off; a very narrow projection just one meter above the floor of the first story, which most probably marks the top of the Romanesque building and indicates the narrowing of the party wall; or even the vestiges of two Romanesque doors overhung by an arched bay and set into the masonry mass under the porch of the main building.

The small size of the double-arched openings on the northwest façade of the residence may have been used to light the interior of a cellar. However, other clues tend to confirm the hypothesis that this Romanesque building was a "Grande Salle". Although the period of construction of the Romanesque building has been established -in other words, towards the end of the 11th and beginning of the 13th centuries- its metrical characteristics have not been determined. The Romanesque building could be the aula built by Abbot Hugues Des Roches. This medieval building was not only embedded in the lower western part of the residence, but also connected to the church via its bell tower. However, the layout of the residence in relation to the church, rules out the hypothesis that the Romanesque structure was a cloister.

=== The church ===
==== Architecture and description ====
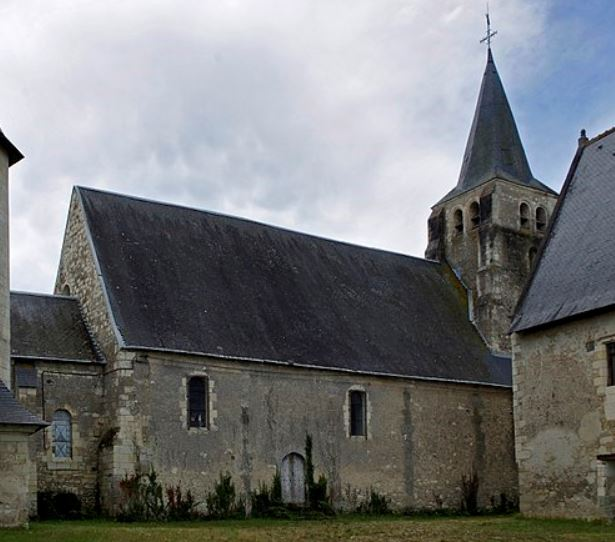
Apse, nave and upper part of bell tower.

The church, dedicated to Saint Sulpice, has a single nave. Rectangular in shape, the nave is dated to the 13th century, or perhaps earlier. The main body of the building is adorned with four asymmetrically arranged arched piédroits, two on each side. The upper part of the nave ends in a paneled vault. This vaulted ceiling is reinforced by a Gothic-style roof structure with exposed king posts and tie beams. The interior of the church has not been altered for several decades.

The church portal has been restored and features a single archivolt. The rectangular choir was probably rebuilt in the 18th century, then equipped with an altarpiece in the following century. It ends in a flat chevet-apse. The choir is supported by two buttresses: one to the north, and one to the south. The southern façade of the building features a doorway leading to the former cemetery. Three inscriptions are engraved on the choir's external keystones. The first reads: "L'an 1657 la grosse cloche fut refaicte". The second inscription reads "Le moi de may 1702, le clocher a été recouvert à neuf". The third inscription reads: "L'an 1711, l'altel du chœur fut refait le jour de Pâques béni". These three inscriptions document several phases of the church's construction, including the rebuilding of the chancel in the early 1710s. An apse was added to the choir as an avant-corps. Built in the 17th century, the apse is enclosed by a stone vault in the shape of a basket handle.

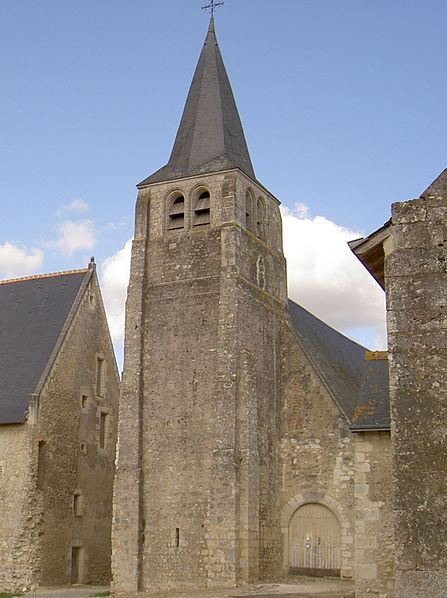
Church bell tower and portal, in the center.

The bell tower, like the nave's southern wall, dates from the 13th century. The tower has a square floor layout. The bell tower, dating from the same period as the nave, is set into the north gable wall. The north façade of the nave was rebuilt around the beginning of the 17th century, probably as a result of damage caused by Huguenot troops in 1598. The bell tower's impact is absorbed by two buttresses on its western facade, extending up to the level of the spire, as well as by a pair of lateral buttresses, lower in height and angled. It is also possible that a tribune, incorporated between two buttresses, was built over the nave. Apart from two arrow slits in its base, the bell tower has no other openings, a feature that "gives it the appearance of a keep". Within the tower, traces indicate that a former high window, probably designed to monitor access to the building, had been blocked up. An upstairs door, also bricked up, gave access to the curtain wall linking the bell tower to the Renaissance barn. A series of arches and the remnants of beams that formed the framework of a staircase connecting the bricked-up door to the first floor of the bell tower are still clearly visible. The upper levels are marked by distinctive battlements. The penultimate level is enlightened by two bays, one to the north and the second to the south. The floor containing the belfry, which may have been built at the same time as the rest of the bell tower (early 13th century), has four blind arcades, one on each side.

==== Furnishing ====
The church's furnishings include three items listed in the supplementary inventory of historical monuments. The first is a polychrome wooden statue of Christ on the Cross. Carved in the 17th century, the bust is particularly well-modeled. The figure's eyelids are closed, his head is bent, nestled between his shoulders, and his legs are slightly bent. The work was added to the list by decree of 29 November 1978.

The second object is a stone tabernacle with two lateral wings. It consists of a base and an entablature that extends along its entire length. Above the entablature is an altarpiece, or ambry, with a "beveled" front, similar to that of the side panels. Each front, framed by ornaments with plant motifs carved in bas-relief, has a niche. Each niche houses the effigy of a saint -one representing Saint Sulpice, the other Saint Anthony of Padua- also carved in bas-relief. The entablature is supported by leaning columns at each corner of the tabernacle. These columns feature classical-style capitals. The altarpiece, in painted wood, is divided into 3 segments by pilasters with Doric capitals. The entablature is crowned by a pediment, whose top opens onto a lunette aligned with the axis of the middle bay. The wide, projecting central bay takes the form of a rectangular panel adorned with molding. Each side bay features a niche resting on a corbel, topped by a lunette-shaped pediment decorated with a shell at the top. Made in 1711 and 1729, the ensemble was listed as a historic object on 9 April 1998.

The third piece is a monstrance crafted in brass using the repoussé and chasing techniques, then gilded with gold leaves. The base of the monstrance is square, decorated with a "mystical" lamb plus geometric and vegetal motifs. The base rests on four feet in the shape of clawed paws. The stem takes the form of an angel with outstretched wings, index finger pointing upwards and feet resting on a globe. The upper part consists of a gloire encircling a decoration of cherubs and ears of wheat, with glassware at the center. The object, made in the 3rd quarter of the 19th century, was included in the list by a decree dated 29 April 1998.

=== The thithe barn ===
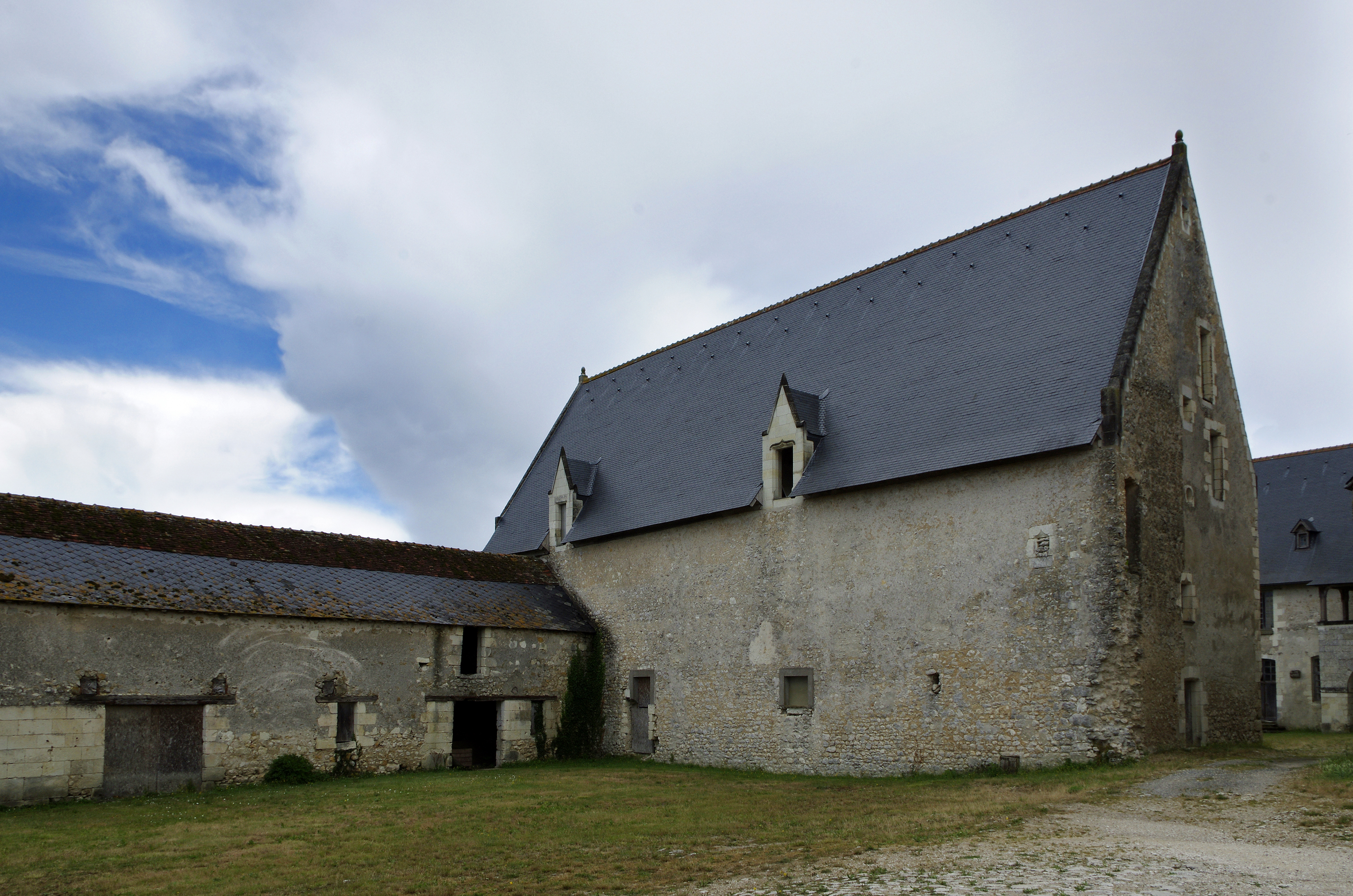
West façade and south gable wall of the barn.

The structures that make up the tithe barn are architecturally coherent. The building has undergone very few alterations, and all share the same architectural style – Gothic. The building was constructed in a single, fast-paced operation by numerous masons and carpenters. The ground layout of the barn is in the form of an irregular quadrilateral, with only the northwest and northeast corners at right angles.

The roof has two steeply inclined sides. It is supported by a hull-shaped wooden framework. This assemblage of wood pieces is made out of 43 trusses and a purlin roof measuring over 10 m in length.

In addition to the first floor, the building has three upper stories topped by an attic. The attic runs the full length of the building and has no partitions. The third floor has a parquet floor made of tongue-and-groove strips held together with wooden pegs and forged nails. The third floor, contemporary with the framework, fits between the "rafter-shaped barns" (also known as " triangle-shaped barns"), (Note: Rafter-frame structures are made up of a set of triangular-section timbers comprising only rafters and crossbeams.) and the king posts.

From its earliest days, the "barn" was intended for domestic use. Few openings have been made on the east façade, which faced the courtyard. In addition, no evidence of chimney elements has been found within the building. However, the third floor of the building probably housed the monastic dormitory.

The first and second floors are adorned with mullioned windows, while four dormer windows -two on the west and two on the east- topped with triangular pediments and devoid of moldings, appear at the top of the façades. The two east-facing dormers are no longer crowned with their wimperg. However, their lintels are adorned with an ogee arch.

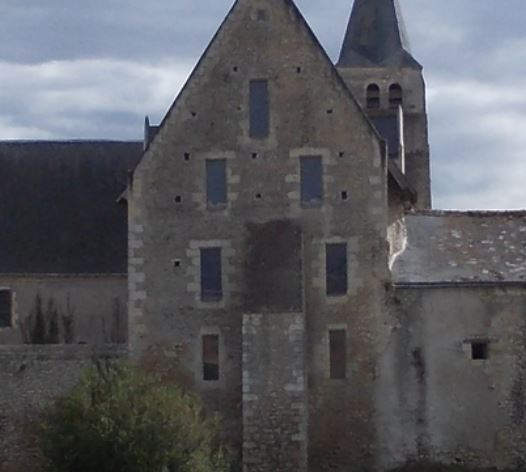
Northern gable wall of the tithe barn with buttress.

At its mid-point, the north gable wall is reinforced by a massive buttress with an inclined upper section. This wall is adorned with high windows on each floor.

The south gable wall was provided with an entrance opening onto an allure, which was connected to the first floor of the church tower. The portion of the wall crowned by the allure was itself provided with an entrance opening onto a porch. This door allowed passage between the courtyard and the forecourt. According to Saint-Jouan, the chief architect of historic monuments, this allure may have been intended to monitor traffic between the two inner courtyards. Traces of the torn-off masonry section framing the porch, probably a pillar, can still be seen from the foundations to halfway up the southwest corner of the southern gable wall. Remnants of a wall section, which dated back to before the barn was built, can still be seen at basement level, in the form of a mortar-coated stone block. The entrance to the barn, adjacent to the former allure leading to the bell tower, has not been obstructed.

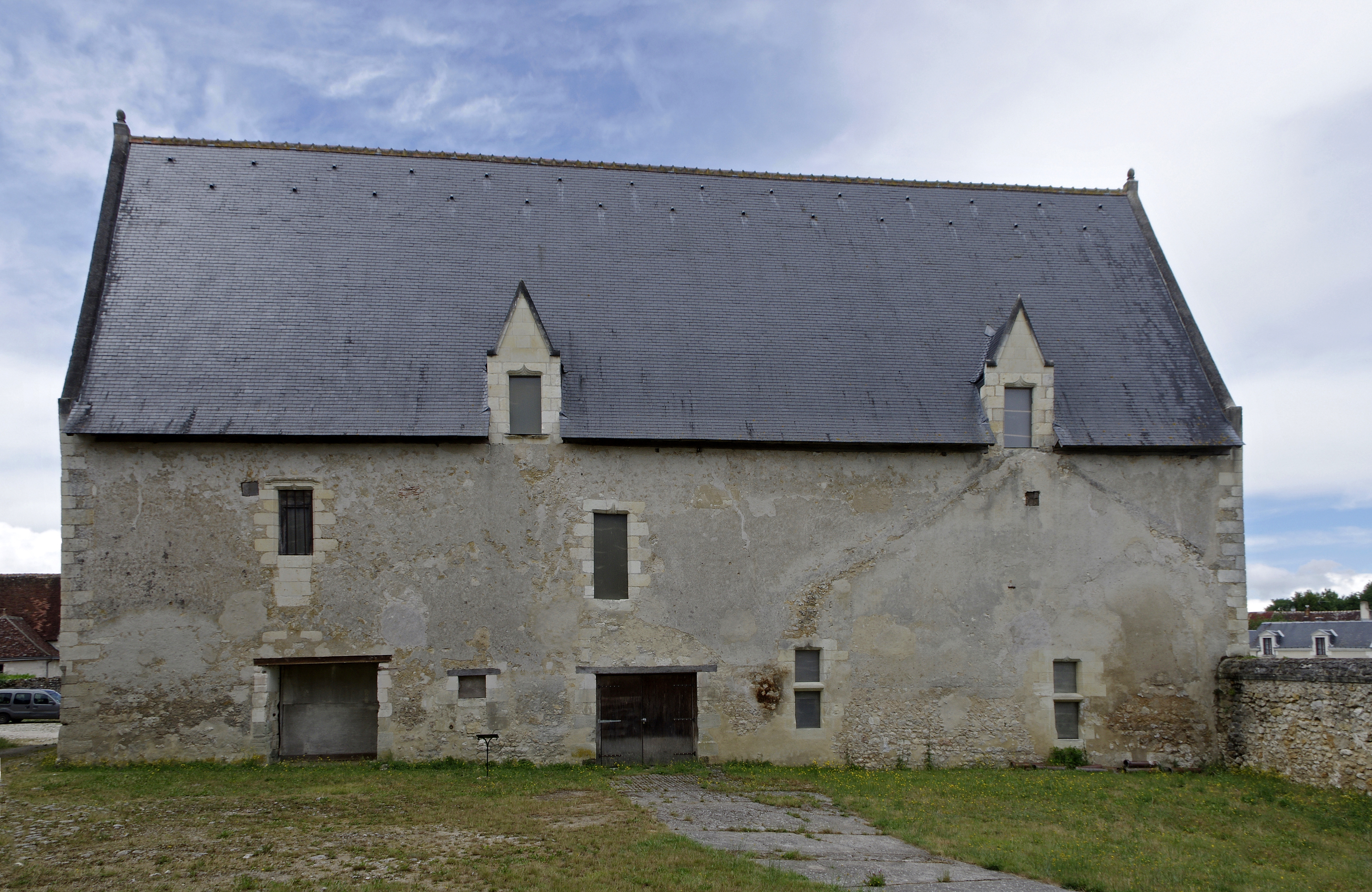
East façade of the barn.

A spiral staircase, incorporated into the southwest corner of the building, provides access to different levels. The original staircase, whose thick treads are now disjointed, is made entirely of oak. On the third level, the stairwell is made up of elaborate panels. Apart from the door leading to the stairwell, the first floor had no other access point.

The masonry on the first floor was remodeled in the second half of the 16th century when the priory was transformed into an agricultural establishment. The two main levels were used to store cereal grain. Graffiti, inscribed in the form of a series of bars, testifies to the activity of accounting for the sacks of grain stored in the building. The goods were probably stored beyond the load-bearing capacity of the two stories, resulting in deformation of the beams. Only one of the posts erected in the 15th century has survived. The others were replaced in the eighteenth and nineteenth centuries by beams spanning 7.25 m at right angles to the walls, to better contain their loads. The traces of this redesign can be seen in the layout of the central main beams. Their length and the diameter of their anchors had been reduced.

All the structural system, including the framework and floor, and the light work, comprising the staircase, third-floor stairwell panels, joinery and hardware, and parquet flooring, are original.

=== Enclosing wall ===
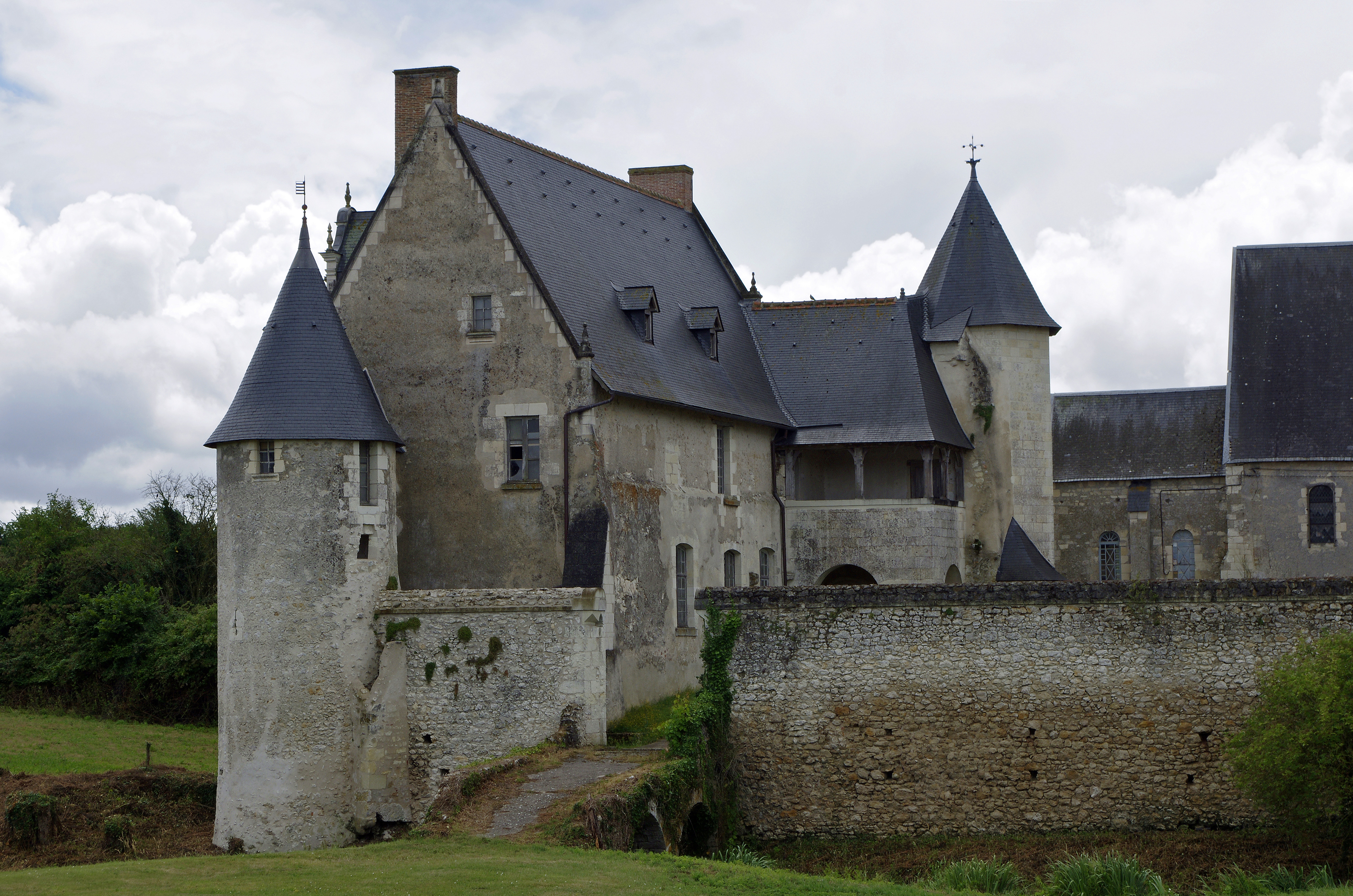
The northeastern corner tower on the left, the drawbridge in the center, flanked by two sections of the surrounding wall.

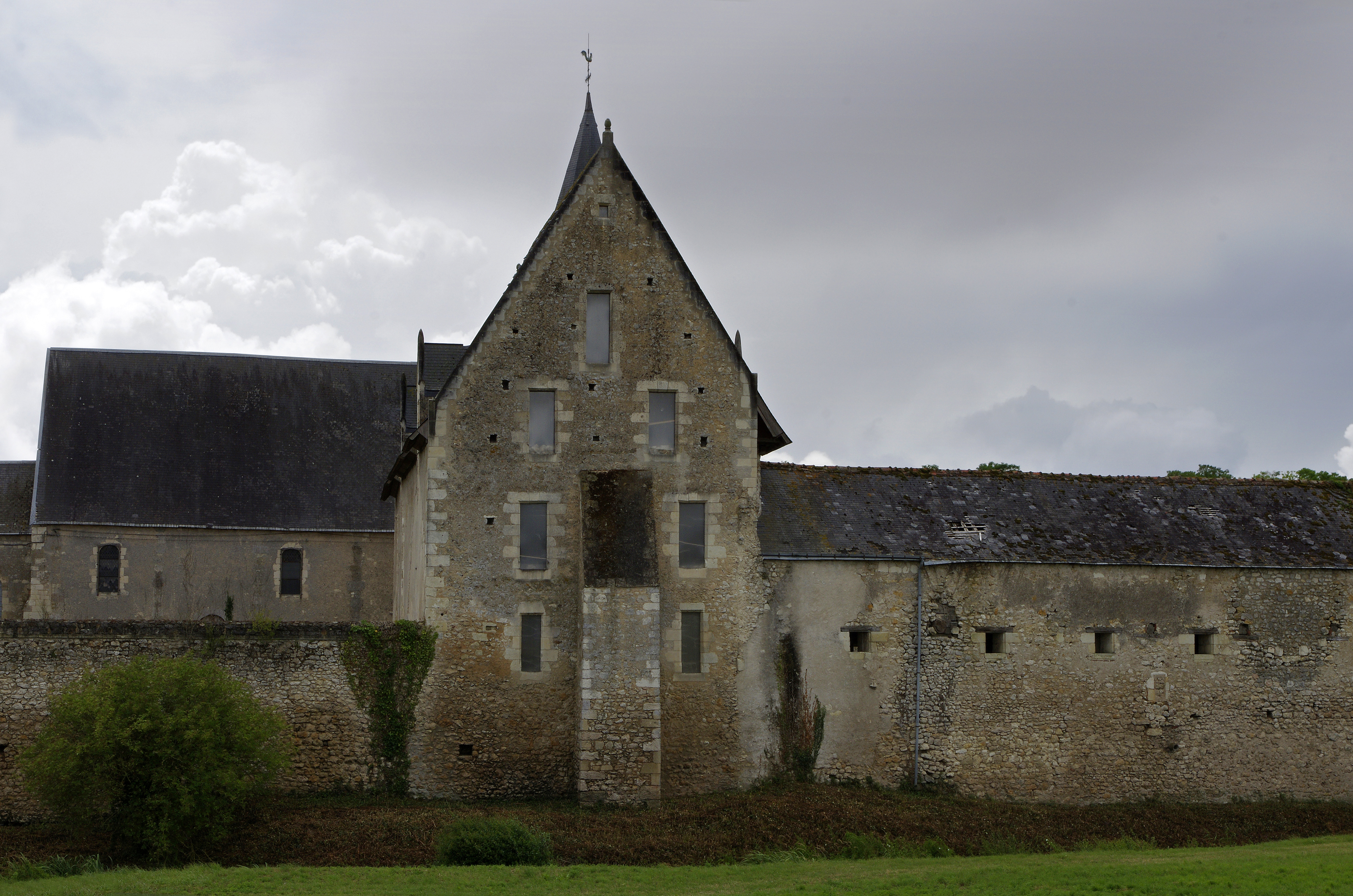
Northern perimeter wall with a moat.

The wall was equipped with four corner turrets and an additional four lateral turrets on the northwest and southeast sides. Currently, only four of these eight turrets are still intact.

The corner tower at the northeast corner features a wooden structure dating from the 18th century. This corner tower closely defends the north gable wall of the priory residence. The remains of a former latrine can still be seen in the section of curtain wall linking these two structures, at the junction point in the southern extension of the garden fence. These latrine remains overhang a postern in the lower part of the defensive structure. This postern, protected by a murder hole that has been partitioned off, is equipped with a drawbridge. A Renaissance medallion adorns the masonry just above the postern.

The drawbridge is located on the northeast side. Grooves for the lift arms (chains) of the defensive drawbridge still mark the walls surrounding the postern. The Jamb still stands in front of a building, with the slot for the deck's axle still visible in the base walls. The abutment containing the bridge loads also remains. The bridge is defended by two lateral towers pierced with murder holes, one of which has been assigned to a house and the second to a servitude.

The curtain wall connecting the second tower, which surrounds the drawbridge, and the southeast corner tower, which has been destroyed, is also flanked by another tower with a murder hole identical to the others.

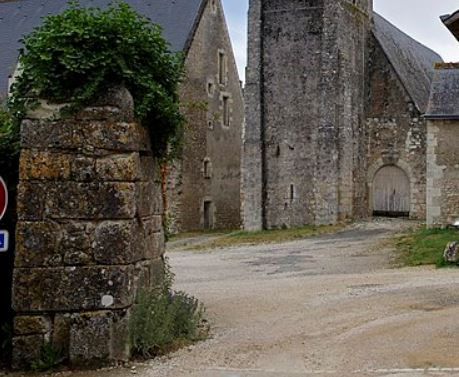
Left pillar of the perimeter gateway.

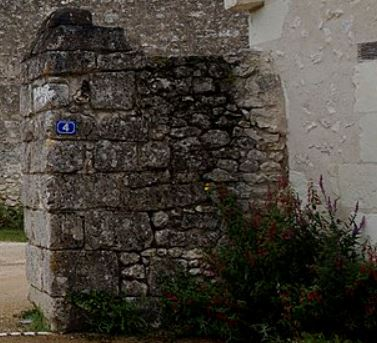
Right pillar of the perimeter gate.

The entrance to the enclosure is via a gateway a few meters from its southwest corner. The gate is defended by two partially dismantled turrets.

The cemetery to the south of the church is enclosed by a section of wall. This southern section, defended by a corner tower and a side tower, extends further west to form the southern wall of the Classical barn.

The north-western wall and one of its flanking side turrets (half its length) remain relatively intact. The north-western corner turret, whose foundations are the only visible remains, is part of a modern residence and protrudes from the bridge. To the east of the northern wall is the standing bridge, allowing dry passage over the Echandon river. This military structure was covered with cobblestones, some of which still remain.

=== Dovecote ===
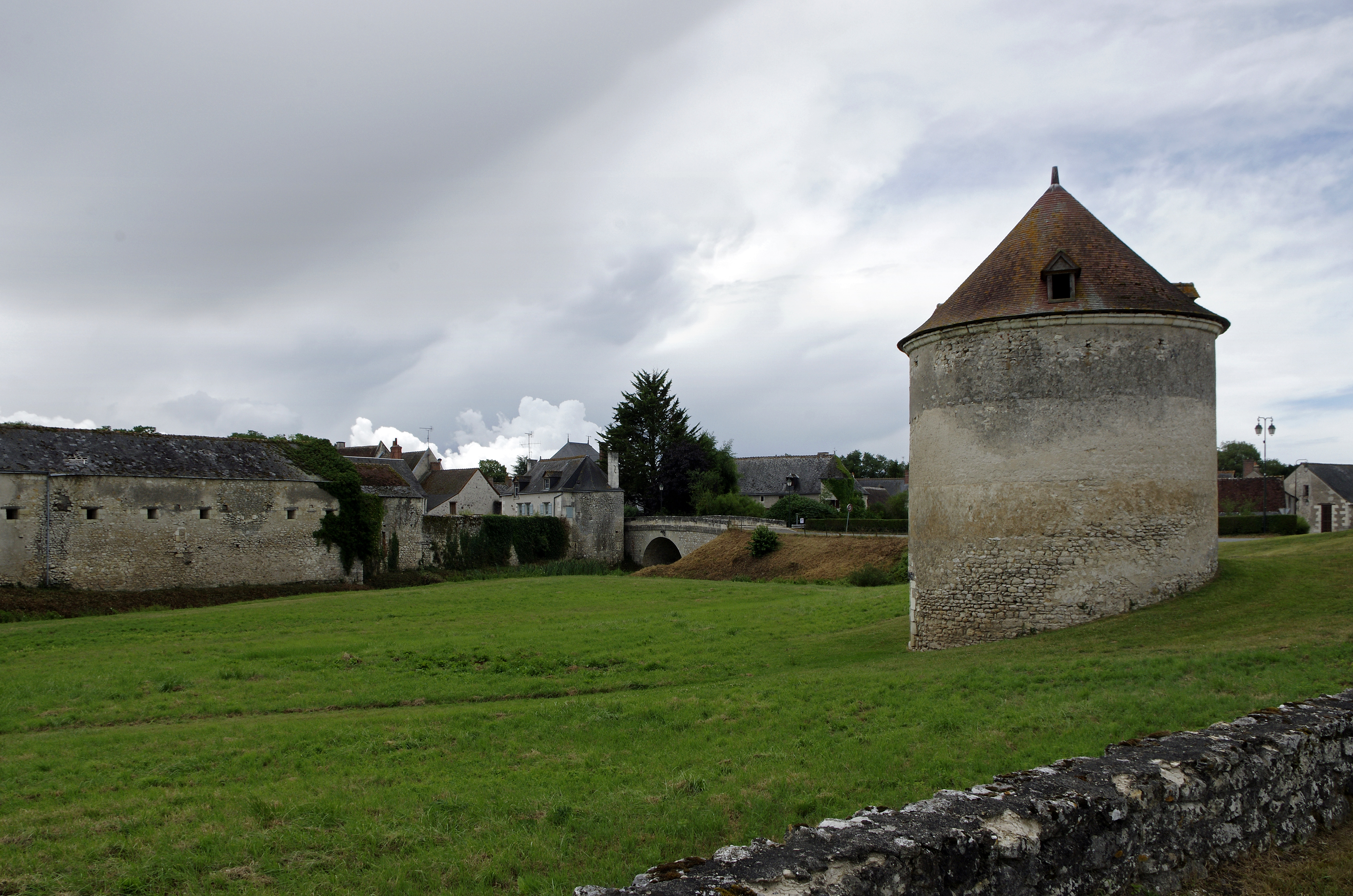
The dovecote surrounded by the garden fence.

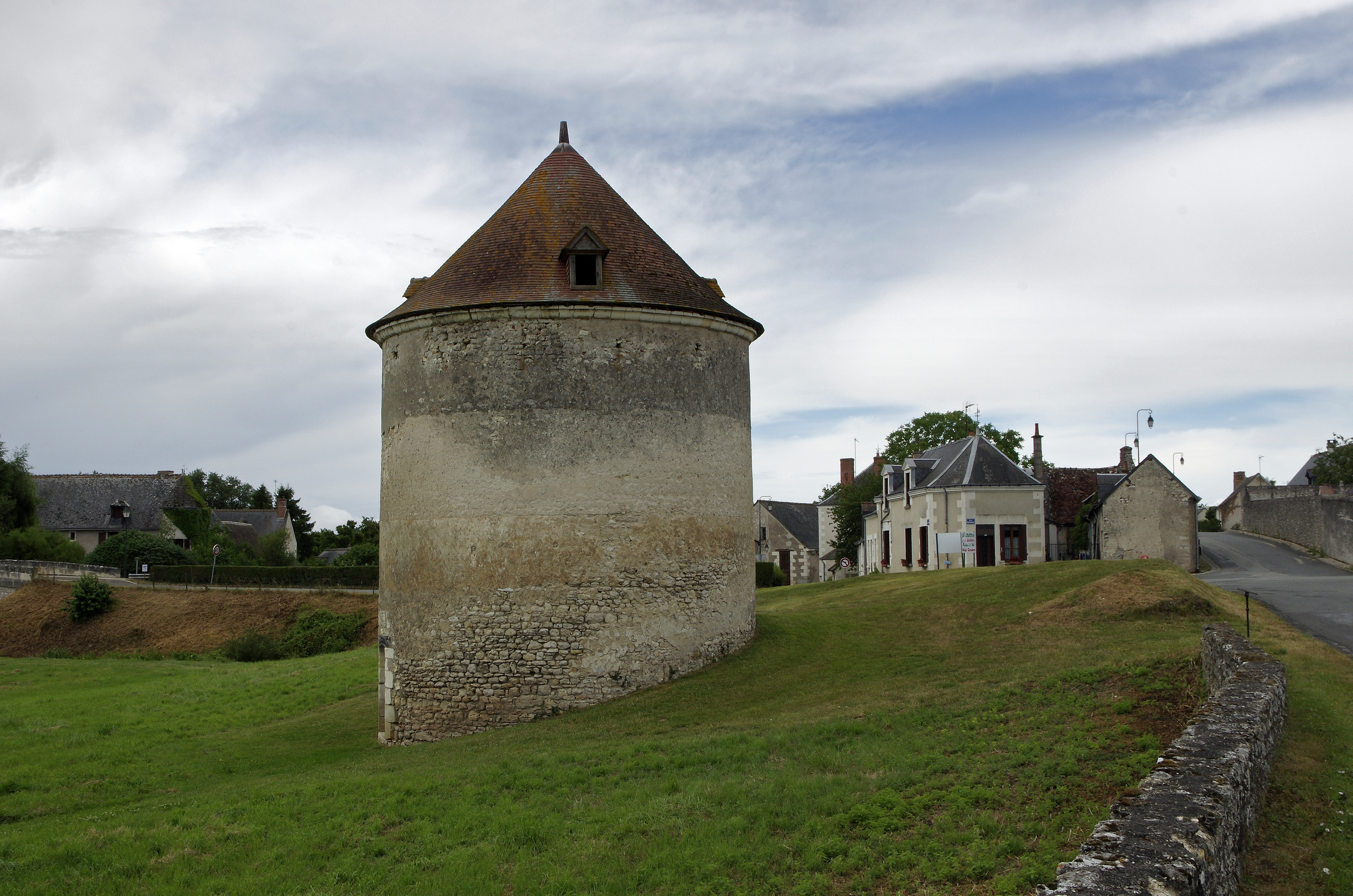
Overview of the dovecote.

The dovecote is circular in design, with an external diameter of around eight meters. The walls are one meter thick. They are made of rubble stone-faced with plaster. The interior of the building, preserved in its original state, is equipped with a rotating shaft and a ladder for climbing up to the height of the boulins (nest hole).

The boulins are made of ashlar. They are divided into 5 different-sized niches, staggered from top to bottom. There are around 1,400 niches. Beneath the two highest rows are four rows -one of which is incomplete- built in terracotta, with circular niches.

The wooden-framed roof surmounts a thin cornice. The roof is illuminated by three dormer windows.

=== Other buildings and structures ===
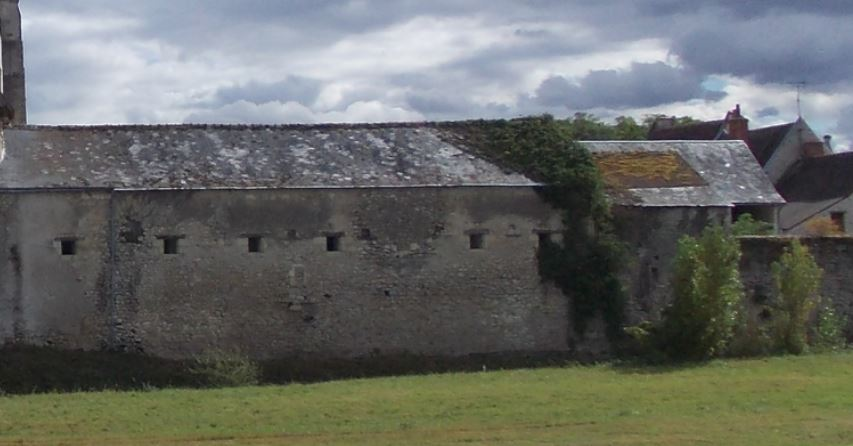
Livestock buildings to the right of the 15th-century barn.

The Classical-style barn, built against the southern perimeter wall, dates from the 17th to 18th centuries. It is rectangular in outline, with a central avant-corps on the northern façade. Its carpentry is based on trees chopped down in 1752. The entrance portal, framed by a wooden lintel, opens via wooden casements. These pieces of timber, like the four crossbeams making up the roof structure, date back to the 15th century and have recently been reused.

Next to the entrance to the polygonal tower of the residence, the remnant of an old well, a margelle, remains. Circular in shape, with a diameter of more than 1 m, the margelle incorporates a salient in the shape of an animal's head, allowing the water to drain away.

The livestock buildings are adjacent to the left end of the west façade of the 15th-century barn. Built in the 19th and 20th centuries, they flank the northern wall of the enclosure.

=== See also ===
- Marmoutier Abbey, Tours
- Counts and dukes of Anjou
- Le Louroux
- fr:Liste des monuments historiques d'Indre-et-Loire (in English: List of historic monuments in Indre-et-Loire)
- fr:Liste des abbayes, prieurés et monastères en France (in English: List of abbeys, priories and monasteries in France)

== Bibliography ==
- Jacques-Xavier Carré de Busserolle, "Le Louroux", in Dictionnaire géographique, historique et biographique d'Indre-et-Loire et de l'ancienne province de Touraine, t. IV, Société archéologique de Touraine, 1882 (read online archive).
- Arnaud de Saint-Jouan, "Le Louroux (Indre-et-Loire). Présentation générale du prieuré", Bulletin de la Société archéologique de Touraine, Société archéologique de Touraine, t. 55, 2009 (read online archive, accessed 19 July 2018).
- Edward Impey and Élisabeth Lorans, "Prieuré du Louroux : Origine et évolution", Bulletin de la Société archéologique de Touraine, Société archéologique de Touraine, t. 42, 1988 (read online archive, accessed 19 July 2018).
- Charles Loiseau de Grandmaison, "Prieuré et seigneurie du Louroux", in Charles Loiseau de Grandmaison, Archives ecclésiastiques antérieures à 1790: inventaire sommaire de la série H – Clergé régulier – H1 987, Archives départementales de Tours, 1891, 358 p. (read online archive [PDF]), p. 283 and 284.
- Émile Mabille, Catalogue analytique des diplômes, chartes et actes relatifs à l'histoire de Touraine – Collection Dom Housseau, t. XIV, Société archéologique de Touraine, coll. "Mémoires de la Société archéologique de Touraine", 1863 (read online archive).
- André Montoux, "L'ensemble médiéval du Louroux", Bulletin de la Société archéologique de Touraine, Société archéologique de Touraine, t. 38, 1978 (read online archive, accessed 19 July 2018).
