= Le Louroux =

- Commune
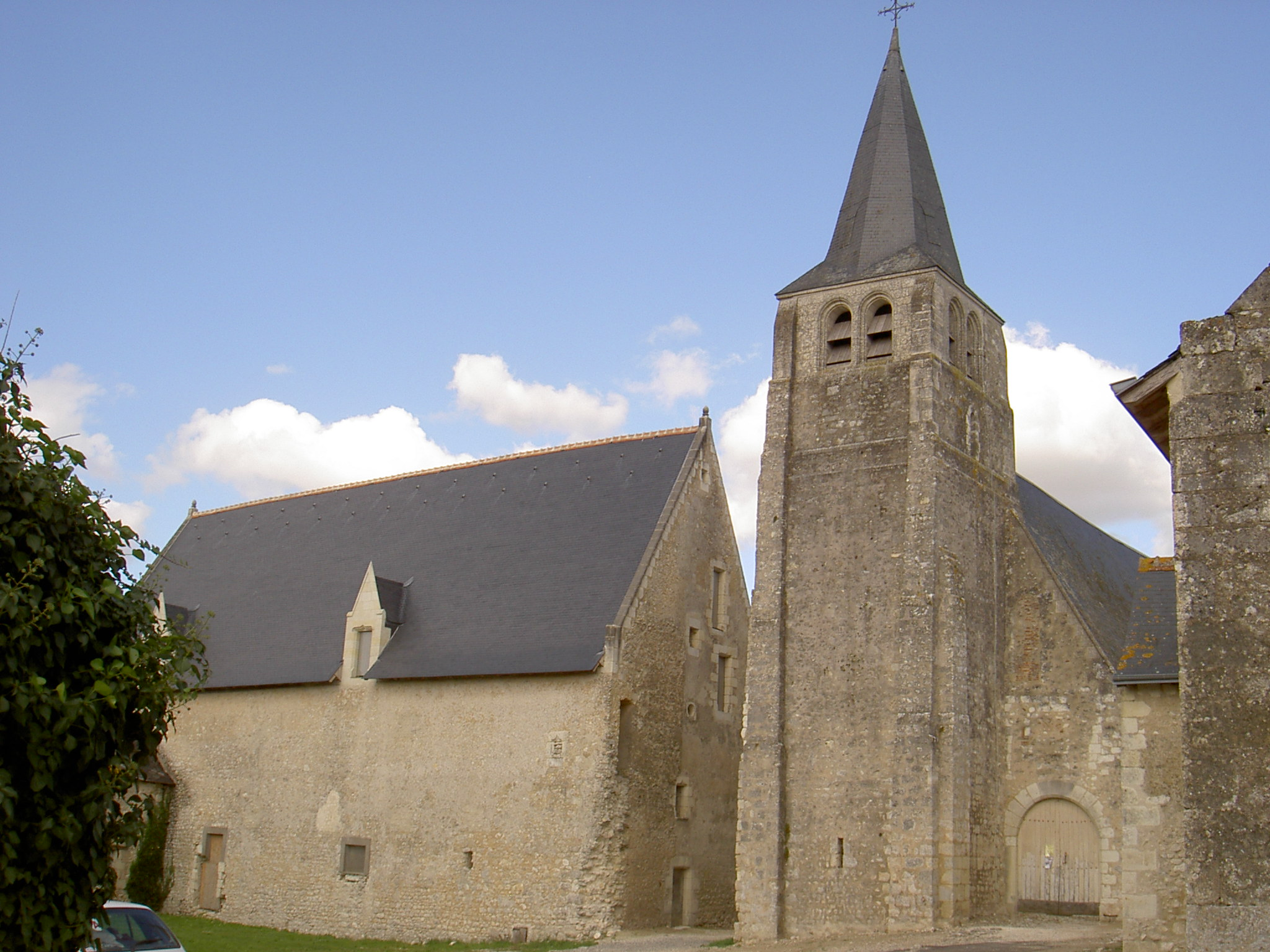
- The church of Saint-Sulpice, in Le Louroux
- Location of Le Louroux
- Location within France Location within Centre-Val de Loire
- Coordinates: 47°09′41″N 0°47′14″E
- Country: France
- Region: Centre-Val de Loire
- Department: Indre-et-Loire
- Arrondissement: Loches
- Canton: Descartes
- Intercommunality: CC Loches Sud Touraine

Government
  - Mayor (2020–2026): Eric Deniau
- Area^{1}: 28.87 km^{2} (11.15 sq mi)
- Highest elevation: 127 m (417 ft)
- Lowest elevation: 79 m (259 ft)
- Population (2023): 533
  - Density: 18.5/km^{2} (47.8/sq mi)
- Time zone: UTC+01:00 (CET)
  - Summer (DST): UTC+02:00 (CEST)
- INSEE/Postal code: 37136 /37240
- ^{1} French Land Register data, which excludes lakes, ponds, glaciers > 1 km^{2} (0.386 sq mi or 247 acres) and river estuaries.

Le Louroux (French pronunciation: [lə luʁu]) is a commune in the Indre-et-Loire department in central France.

== Population ==
Historical population
Year	Pop.	±% p.a.
1968	442	—
1975	364	−2.74%
1982	352	−0.48%
1990	372	+0.69%
1999	425	+1.49%
2007	471	+1.29%
2012	487	+0.67%
2017	531	+1.75%
2023	533	+0.06%
Source: INSEE

== See also ==
- Communes of the Indre-et-Loire department
- Louroux Priory
