= Tauxigny =

Commune in Indre-et-Loire, France

- Part of Tauxigny-Saint-Bauld
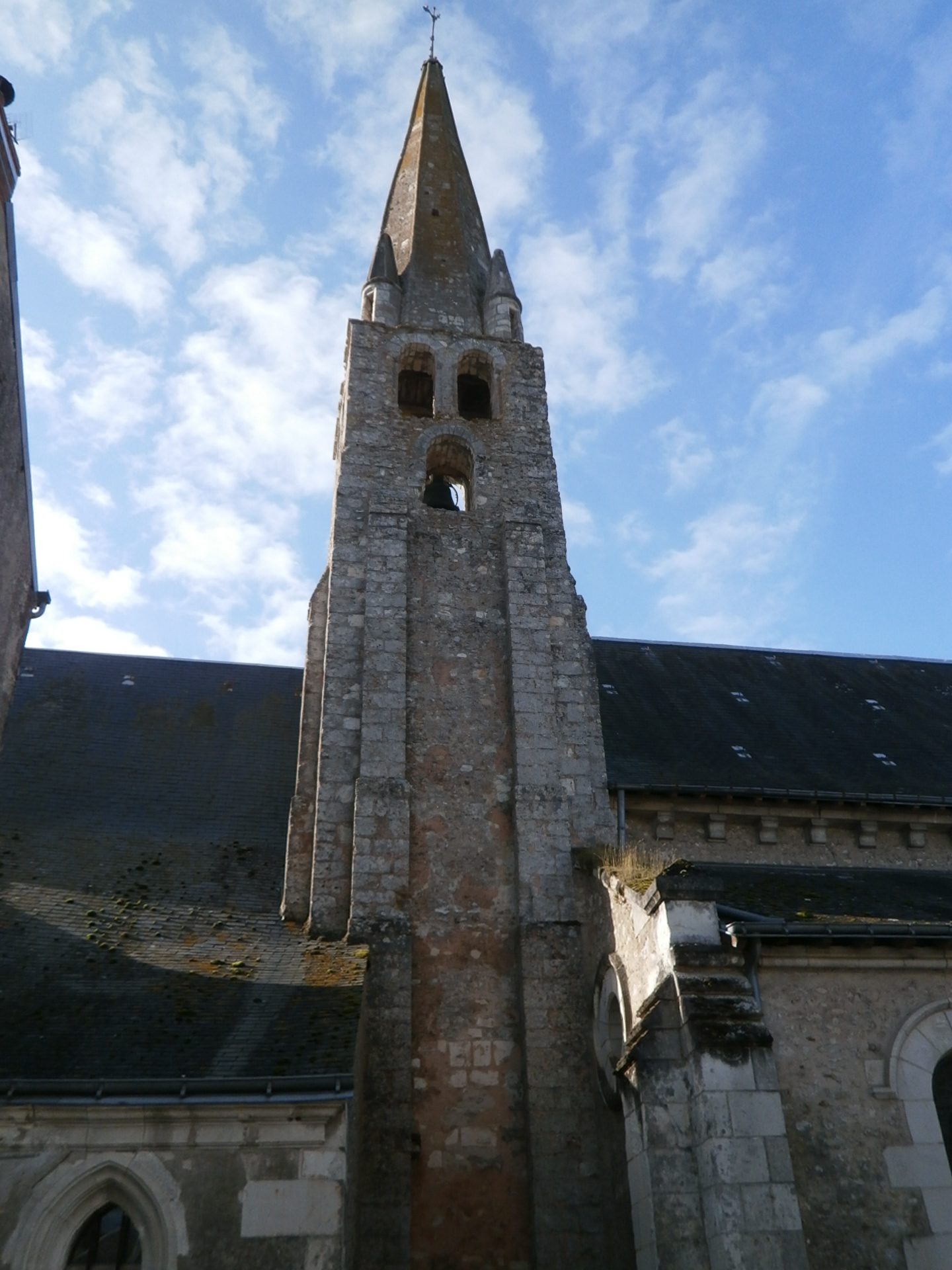
- The church in Tauxigny

- Coat of arms
- Location of Tauxigny
- Location within France Location within Centre-Val de Loire
- Coordinates: 47°12′53″N 0°50′07″E
- Country: France
- Region: Centre-Val de Loire
- Department: Indre-et-Loire
- Arrondissement: Loches
- Canton: Loches
- Commune: Tauxigny-Saint-Bauld
- Area^{1}: 36.83 km^{2} (14.22 sq mi)
- Highest elevation: 114 m (374 ft)
- Lowest elevation: 67 m (220 ft)
- Population (2015): 1,403
  - Density: 38.09/km^{2} (98.66/sq mi)
- Time zone: UTC+01:00 (CET)
  - Summer (DST): UTC+02:00 (CEST)
- Postal code: 37310
- ^{1} French Land Register data, which excludes lakes, ponds, glaciers > 1 km^{2} (0.386 sq mi or 247 acres) and river estuaries.

Tauxigny (French pronunciation: [toksiɲi]) is a former commune in the Indre-et-Loire department in central France. On 1 January 2018, it was merged into the new commune of Tauxigny-Saint-Bauld.

== Population ==
Historical population

Year	Pop.	±% p.a.
1793	1,180	—
1821	1,215	+0.10%
1846	1,384	+0.52%
1872	1,242	−0.42%
1901	1,150	−0.27%
1926	1,064	−0.31%
1946	986	−0.38%
1962	896	−0.60%

Year	Pop.	±% p.a.
1968	819	−1.49%
1975	798	−0.37%
1982	866	+1.18%
1990	976	+1.51%
1999	1,090	+1.24%
2006	1,219	+1.61%
2015	1,403	+1.57%

Source: EHESS and INSEE

== See also ==
- Communes of the Indre-et-Loire department
