= Tauxigny-Saint-Bauld =

- Commune
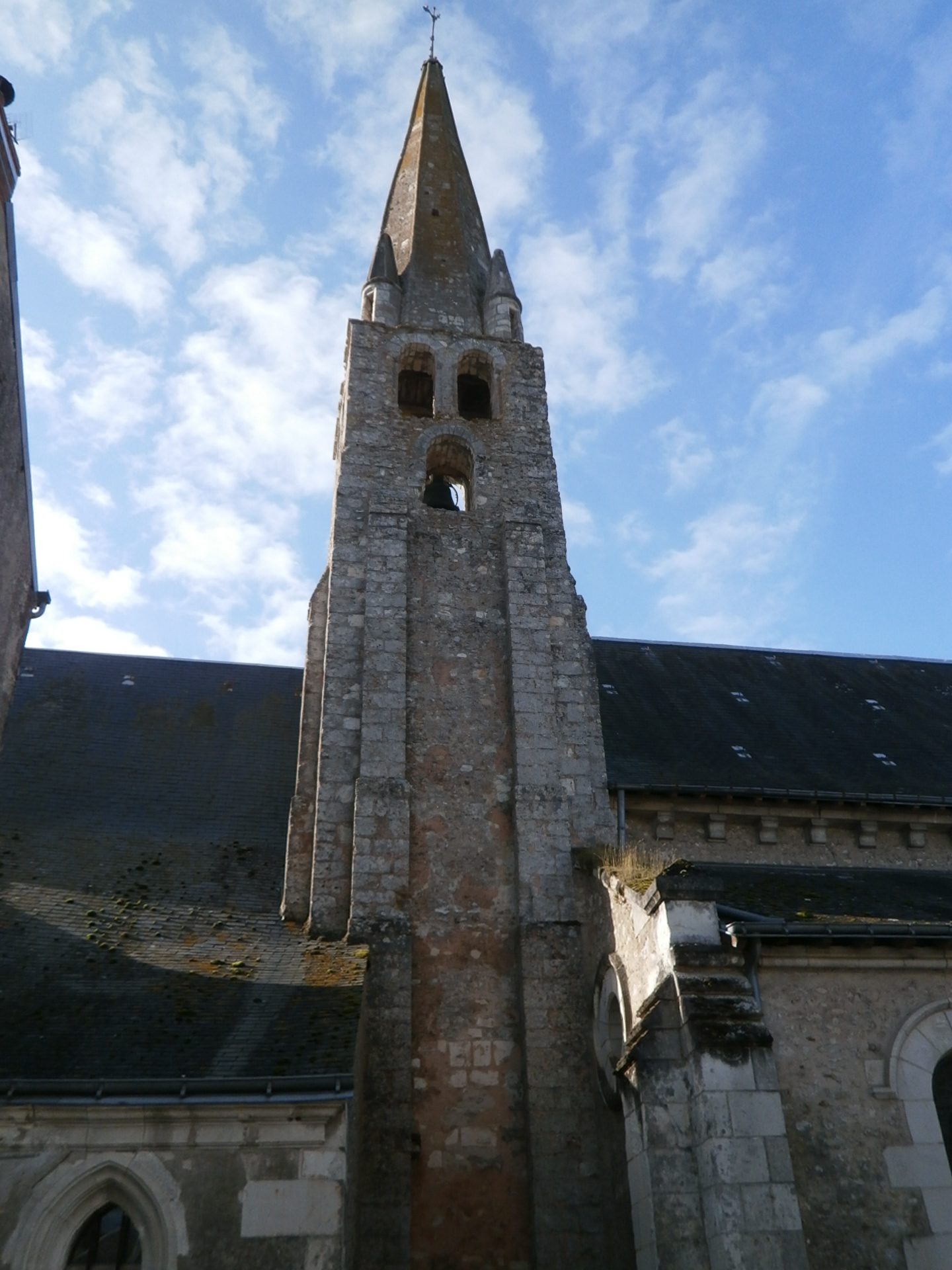
- Location of Tauxigny-Saint-Bauld
- Location within France Location within Centre-Val de Loire
- Coordinates: 47°12′53″N 0°50′07″E
- Country: France
- Region: Centre-Val de Loire
- Department: Indre-et-Loire
- Arrondissement: Loches
- Canton: Loches
- Intercommunality: CC Loches Sud Touraine

Government
  - Mayor (2020–2026): Jean-Louis Robin
- Area^{1}: 40.94 km^{2} (15.81 sq mi)
- Population (2023): 1,688
  - Density: 41.23/km^{2} (106.8/sq mi)
- Time zone: UTC+01:00 (CET)
  - Summer (DST): UTC+02:00 (CEST)
- INSEE/Postal code: 37254 /37310
- ^{1} French Land Register data, which excludes lakes, ponds, glaciers > 1 km^{2} (0.386 sq mi or 247 acres) and river estuaries.

Tauxigny-Saint-Bauld (French pronunciation: [toksiɲi sɛ̃ bo]) is a commune in the department of Indre-et-Loire, central France. The municipality was established on 1 January 2018 by merger of the former communes of Tauxigny (the seat) and Saint-Bauld.

== See also ==
- Communes of the Indre-et-Loire department
