= Saint-Bauld =

Commune in Indre-et-Loire, France

- Part of Tauxigny-Saint-Bauld
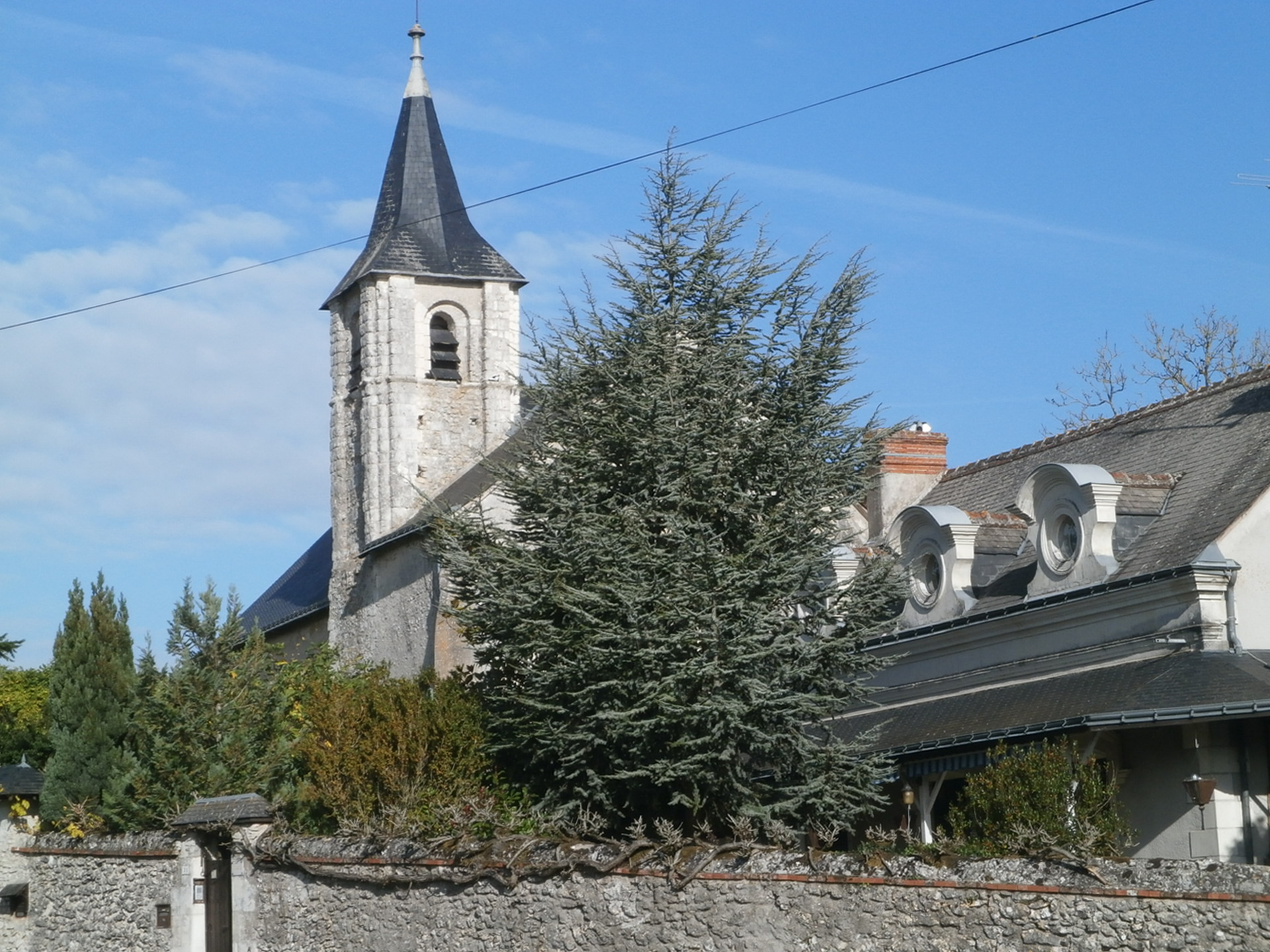
- The church in Saint-Bauld
- Location of Saint-Bauld
- Location within France Location within Centre-Val de Loire
- Coordinates: 47°10′51″N 0°50′17″E
- Country: France
- Region: Centre-Val de Loire
- Department: Indre-et-Loire
- Arrondissement: Loches
- Canton: Loches
- Commune: Tauxigny-Saint-Bauld
- Area^{1}: 4.11 km^{2} (1.59 sq mi)
- Highest elevation: 103 m (338 ft)
- Lowest elevation: 77 m (253 ft)
- Population (2023): 176
  - Density: 42.8/km^{2} (111/sq mi)
- Time zone: UTC+01:00 (CET)
  - Summer (DST): UTC+02:00 (CEST)
- Postal code: 37310
- ^{1} French Land Register data, which excludes lakes, ponds, glaciers > 1 km^{2} (0.386 sq mi or 247 acres) and river estuaries.

Saint-Bauld (French pronunciation: [sɛ̃ bo]) is a former commune in the Indre-et-Loire department in central France. On 1 January 2018, it was merged into the new commune of Tauxigny-Saint-Bauld.

== See also ==
- Communes of the Indre-et-Loire department
