= Azuis River =

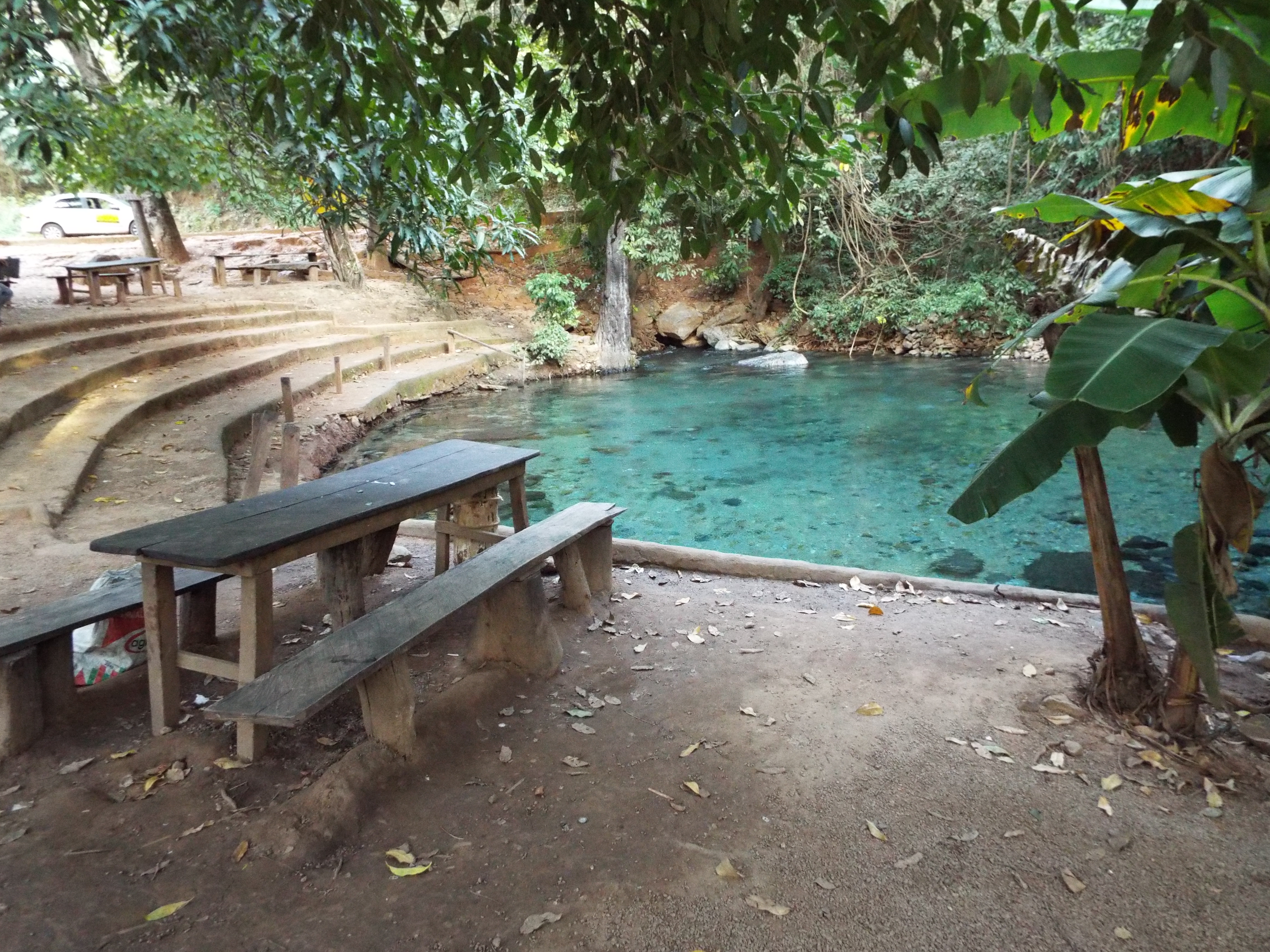
- Azuis River in Aurora do Tocantins

Location
- Country: Brazil

Physical characteristics
- Mouth
  - location: 12.580807°S 46.407980°W
- Length: 147 m (482 ft)

The Azuis River is a river located Aurora do Tocantins in the state of Tocantins in Brazil. With an extension of only 147 metres (482 ft), the Azuis River is considered as the shortest river in Brazil and Latin America and the third shortest river in the world, according to the Guinness World Records.

== See also ==
- List of rivers of Tocantins
