= Aurora do Tocantins =

Municipality in Tocantins, Brazil

- Municipality
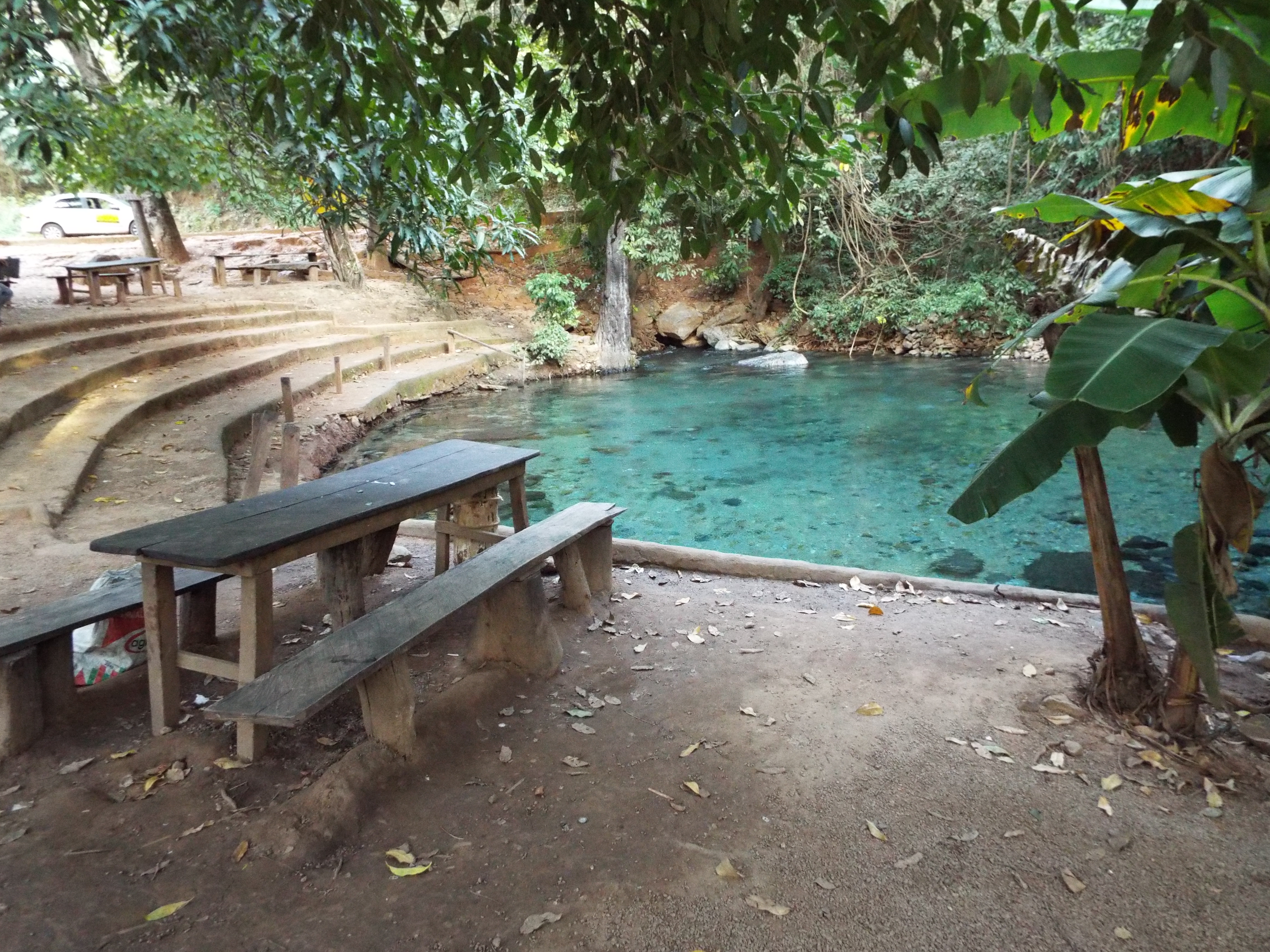
- The Azuis River

- Location in Tocantins state

- Location in Brazil
- Coordinates: 12°42′46″S 46°24′28″W
- Country: Brazil
- Region: North
- State: Tocantins

Area
  - Total: 753 km^{2} (291 sq mi)

Population (2020)
  - Total: 3,783
  - Density: 5.02/km^{2} (13.0/sq mi)
- Time zone: UTC−3 (BRT)

Aurora do Tocantins is a municipality located in the Brazilian state of Tocantins. Its population is 3,783 (2020) and its area is 753 km^{2}.

== Twin towns ==
- Descartes, France
