= Communauté de communes de Montrésor =

Montrésor
- Former communauté de communes
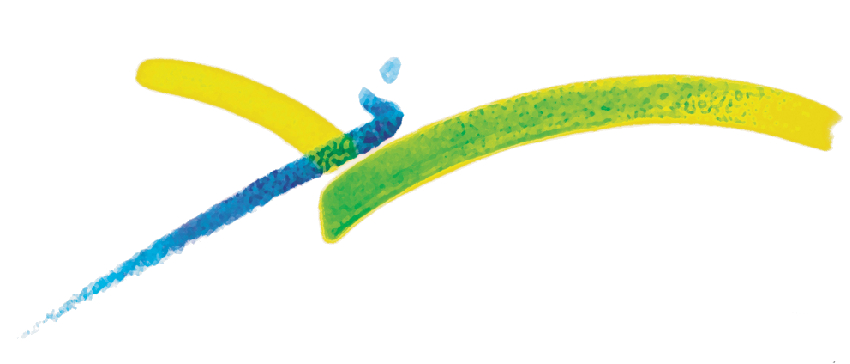

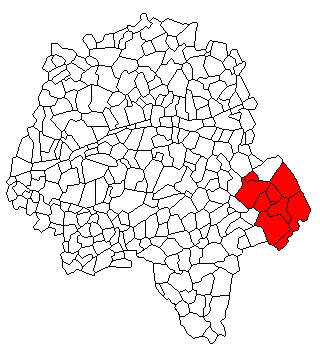
- Location of the Communauté de communes de Montrésor in Indre-et-Loire
- Country: France
- Region: {{{region}}}
- Department: {{{department}}}
- No. of communes: {{{nbcomm}}}
- Established: 13 December 2000
- Disbanded: 31 December 2016
- Area: 373.78 km^{2} (144.32 sq mi)
- Population (2013): 5,645
  - Density: 15.10/km^{2} (39.12/sq mi)

The Communauté de communes de Montrésor is a former communauté de communes, an intercommunal structure, in the Indre-et-Loire department, in the Centre-Val de Loire region, central France. It was created in December 2000. It was merged into the newly created Communauté de communes Loches Sud Touraine on 1 January 2017. In 2013, it had a population of 5,645 with its intercommunal seat located in Montrésor.

== Composition ==
The Communauté de communes comprised the following communes:

List of communes of the intercommunality
Name	INSEE code	Demonym	Area (km^{2})	Population (2014)	Density (per km^{2})
Montrésor (Seat)	37157	Montrésoriens	0.98	350	357
Beaumont-Village	37023	Beaumontois	19.25	280	15
Chemillé-sur-Indrois	37069	Chemillois	24.87	208	8,4
Genillé	37111	Genillois	63.12	1,562	25
Le Liège	37127	Liégeois	11.15	355	32
Loché-sur-Indrois	37133		74.13	557	7,5
Nouans-les-Fontaines	37173	Nouanais	63.31	781	12
Orbigny	37177	Orbignois	65.88	756	11
Villedômain	37275	Villedominis	16.47	122	7,4
Villeloin-Coulangé	37277	Villaloupéens	34.62	647	19

== Administration ==
=== President ===
List of presidents of the Communauté de communes de Montrésor
In office		Name	Party	Capacity	Ref.
2000	2008	Jean Lévêque	DVD	Mayor of Villeloin-Coulangé, General councillor (1979–2011)	
2008	2016	Henry Frémont	DVD	Mayor of Chemillé-sur-Indrois	

== See also ==
- Saint-Sauveur de Villeloin Abbey
