= Beaugerais Abbey =

Cistercian abbey in Indre-et-Loire, France

Coordinates: 47°03′13″N 1°11′56″E

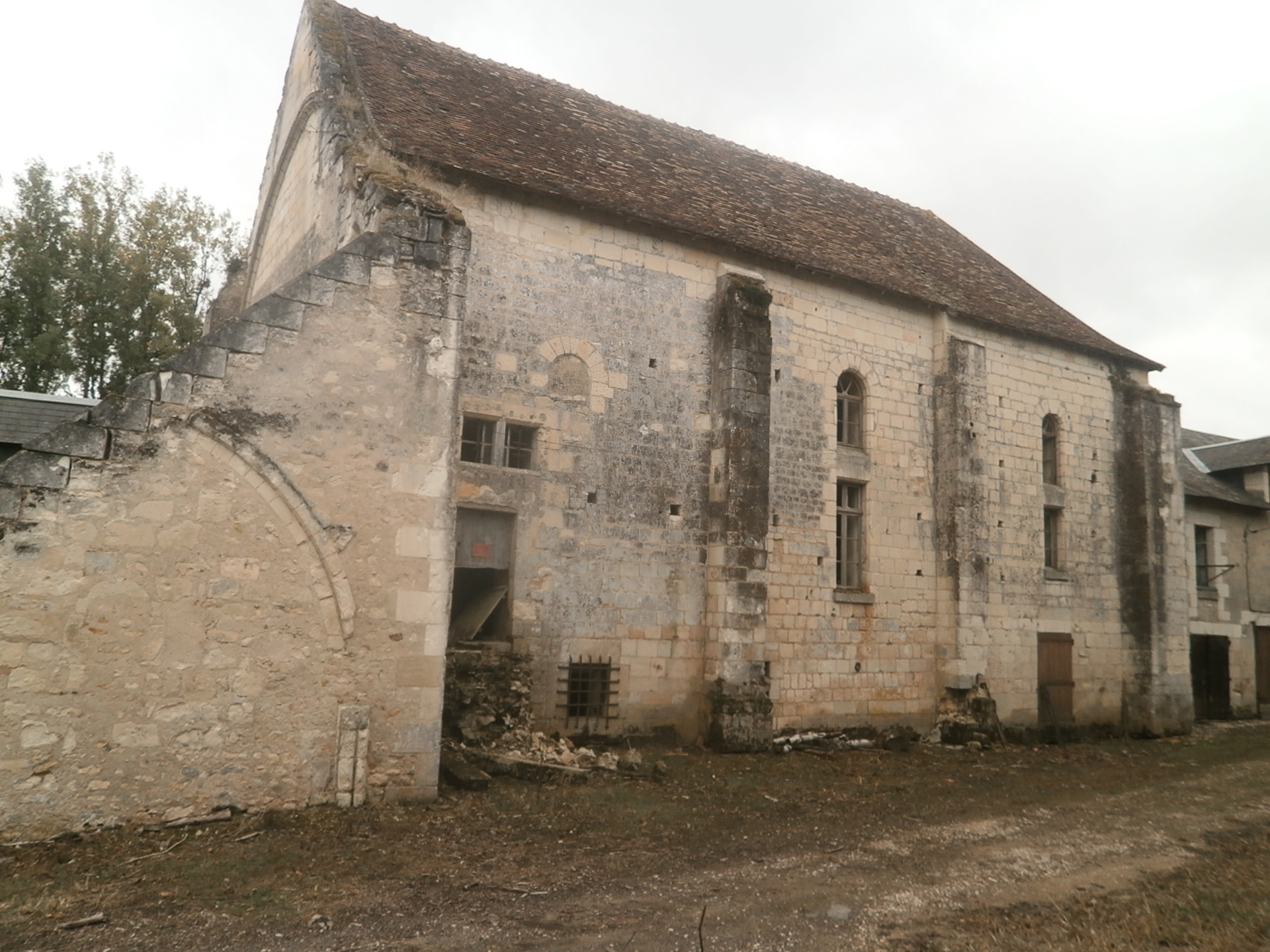
- General view of the remains of the abbey church (north-west façade).

Religion
- District: Loché-sur-Indrois
- Province: Centre-Val de Loire
- Region: Touraine
- Deity: Mary, mother of Jesus

Location
- Country: France
- Interactive map of Beaugerais Abbey

Architecture
- Completed: 1184

Beaugerais Abbey (or Baugerais Abbey) is a former Cistercian abbey, located in what is now the commune of Loché-sur-Indrois, in the Indre-et-Loire department of France.

Founded in the mid-11th century by a hermit supported by the Augustinians of Sainte-Barbe-en-Auge Abbey (Mézidon-Canon, Calvados), it soon came under the control of the Cistercians of Louroux Abbey; Two centuries of wealth followed, thanks to numerous donations from lords and wealthy landowners, but Beaugerais was located in an area where abbeys and priories were already numerous, leading to a number of "neighborhood conflicts". From the first half of the 14th century onwards, the situation changed dramatically: donations stopped, the abbey had to contribute financially to the Hundred Years' War, the buildings were looted and possibly partially destroyed by the English in the 1360s, or at least the buildings were extensively refurbished and a new abbey church built. A century later, Beaugerais Abbey came under the in commendam regime, one of its most famous abbots being Michel de Marolles in the 17th century. The abbey recovered temporarily, and its buildings were rebuilt, but the number of monks declined inexorably. By the time of the French Revolution, only two monks remained. The abbey was sold as bien national in 1792 and most of the buildings destroyed less than ten years later.

In the 21st century, all that remains of the Beaugerais buildings is the nave of the first abbey church, with one of its bays removed. The choir and transept have disappeared, as have a few sections of wall attributable to a second abbey church, and a very small part of the cloister. These remains are listed as a monument historique.

== Location ==
In modern geographic terms, Beaugerais Abbey is located in the south-western part of the vast territory of the Loché-sur-Indrois commune, 4.5 km south-south-west of the main town and 1.5 km north-east of the communal boundary with Saint-Cyran-du-Jambot in the neighboring Indre department, these distances being indicated "as the crow flies".

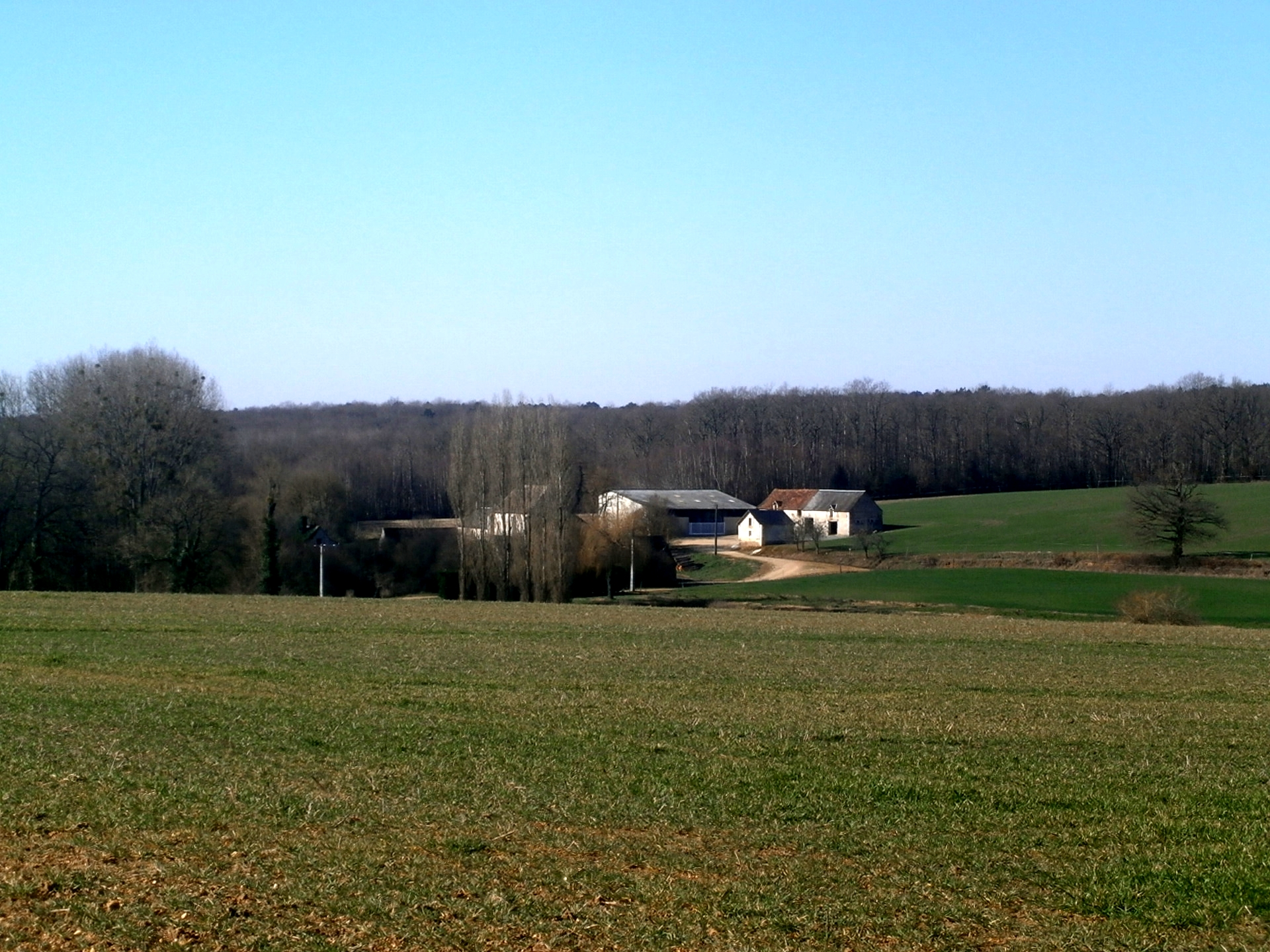
The abbey site at the edge of the Beaugerais woods.

The abbey is set slightly above the Beaugerais stream, on the edge of the Beaugerais woods, the last outcrop of the Loches forest. At the time of the establishment's foundation, the forest was much more present in the immediate vicinity of Beaugerais, but it was cleared on the initiative of the monks; the abbey was then directly served by the road from Montrésor to Châtillon-sur-Indre, still visible on the Napoleonic cadastre, which put its isolation into perspective. In the 21st century, this road has been reduced to a simple footpath, with access to the site via a dead-end road branching off the road from Loché-sur-Indrois to Châtillon-sur-Indre. This road was probably used by pilgrims traveling from northern France to Santiago de Compostela via Orléans and Limoges.

== History ==
=== Toponymy ===
The name Beaugerais could be an evolution of the Gallic balcos, designating the muddy, vegetation-trodden lodging of a wild animal; it could also be derived from the anthroponym Bauger, common in the region. The same Beaugerais toponym is found in Argy and Arpheuilles, in the Indre department, where it refers to former possessions of the Cistercian abbey of Loché.

=== Foundation ===
In the early 1150s, a man named Serlon and a few companions settled on the edge of the Loches forest, perhaps on the banks of the Beaugerais stream. The proximity of a pilgrimage route may have been a factor in their choice of this location, as the hermits occasionally served as guides for travelers crossing the forest in exchange for alms. As early as 1153, this settlement was confirmed by donations made by four local knights leaving for the Holy Land after the Second Crusade, Renaud de Sennevières, Ulric de Châtillon, Archambaud d'Argy and Guillaume de Montrésor - and by some forty other local notables; Barthélémy, perhaps the parish priest of Loché, was also involved in this foundation. Shortly afterwards, Augustinian canons from Sainte-Barbe-en-Auge (Mézidon-Canon) reinforced the hermitage, which was transformed into a monastery, as confirmed by a charter from Henry II of England, who refers to the site as Baugeseyum.

By 1172, the spiritual and material situation of the new monastery appeared to be precarious, both because of dissensions among the monks over the direction to be taken by their community, and because of the limited means at their disposal. The Cistercians of Louroux were called in to help Beaugerais. It was a true refoundation, which took place at an undefined date between 1177 and 1189, probably accompanied by a transfer of the abbey site to new buildings a little further away from the stream, affiliation to the Cistercian order having perhaps been the condition imposed for the abbey's material recovery. A charter establishing the monks' new rights was drawn up after the fact, and solemnly signed by Henry II, King of England, who ruled the western half of France at the time. The abbey church may have been consecrated in 1184, as was its high altar; it is possible, however, that at this date, construction of the abbey church had not yet been completed, but that its choir had been built and the consecration of its altar made it possible to celebrate services there. On this occasion, the church would have been endowed with relics of Saint Eusice from Selles-en-Berry, Saint Julien of Le Mans and Saint Ours from Loches, as well as Thomas Becket and the True Cross.

=== Initial prosperity ===
The Beaugerais outbuildings around 1630.

The number of monks originally present is not specified. However, the Carta Caritatis ("charter of charity") drawn up under the leadership of Étienne Harding clearly states that any new foundation, in order to qualify as an "abbey", must be served, in addition to the abbot, by twelve monks (not counting the lay brothers).

The abbey benefited from numerous donations (farms, land) from local lords, and its possessions extended far beyond the present-day Indre-et-Loire department, as it controlled estates in the Indre berrichonne. However, the abbeys of Landais (in Frédille) and Barzelle (in Poulaines), other Cistercian foundations in the Indre region, seemed concerned by the presence of this newcomer; under the terms of an agreement signed as early as 1171, they ensured that Beaugerais' possessions could no longer extend in their direction, and in exchange undertook not to expand towards Beaugerais, without however calling into question the donations made in the past. As the Chartreuse du Liget, also created at Henry II's instigation, the Abbey of Saint-Sauveur de Villeloin, founded in the 9th century, and the Grandmont priory of Villiers, a contemporary of Beaugerais, were already blocking access to the territories to the north, donations to Beaugerais were mainly concentrated to the west and in the Indre valley, to the southwest. The figure "Beaugerais dependencies circa 1630", although based on data from the modern era, shows how Beaugerais territories fit into the existing monastic network. In addition to its numerous territorial possessions, the abbey also acquired a substantial library, much of which was found in Caen before the end of the 11th century by Geoffroy de Breteuil, prior of Beaugerais from Sainte-Barbe-en-Auge, who died in 1194. Correspondence between Geoffroy de Breteuil and Jean, the first abbot of Beaugerais, provides valuable information on the early history of the abbey.

Throughout the 13th century, donations to the abbey continued to be made by lords from Berry and Touraine, but it is difficult to draw up an accurate, detailed inventory at any given date, as Beaugerais ceded part of its holdings in return for rent.

=== Financial difficulties and conflicts ===
From the beginning of the 14th century, donations to the abbey began to dwindle, and abbots had to insist on recovering the sums owed to the abbey for, among other things, the upkeep and refurbishment of the buildings. Some abbots, such as Denis at the beginning of the 14th century, were so insistent (with threats of excommunication, exaggerated demands) that a letter from Philip the Fair was needed to encourage them to use "softer" methods. Around the middle of the 14th century, donations to the abbey ceased for good, as the monastery had to pay taxes to the kingdom to finance the Hundred Years' War. Beaugerais suffered directly from the consequences of this conflict, its buildings being devastated - their partial destruction, mentioned in chronicles of the period, cannot be attested to by available archaeological sources - and the monks certainly forced to take refuge in one of the abbey's possessions at Beaulieu-lès-Loches. In a charter dated August 23, 1438, King Charles VII granted Beaugerais the right to build fortifications to protect the abbey; in the complete absence of remains, it is not known whether this authorization was followed by action, even though other letters from Charles VII appoint Jean de Prie as captain of the fortress.

In 1333, a document listing the financial resources of all Cistercian abbeys in the kingdom of France, by virtue of their contribution to the decime, revealed that Beaugerais was one of a group of around twenty male abbeys (out of almost two hundred) whose tax payments amounted to just one hundred sous per annum, placing it among the poorest of the French Bernardine establishments.

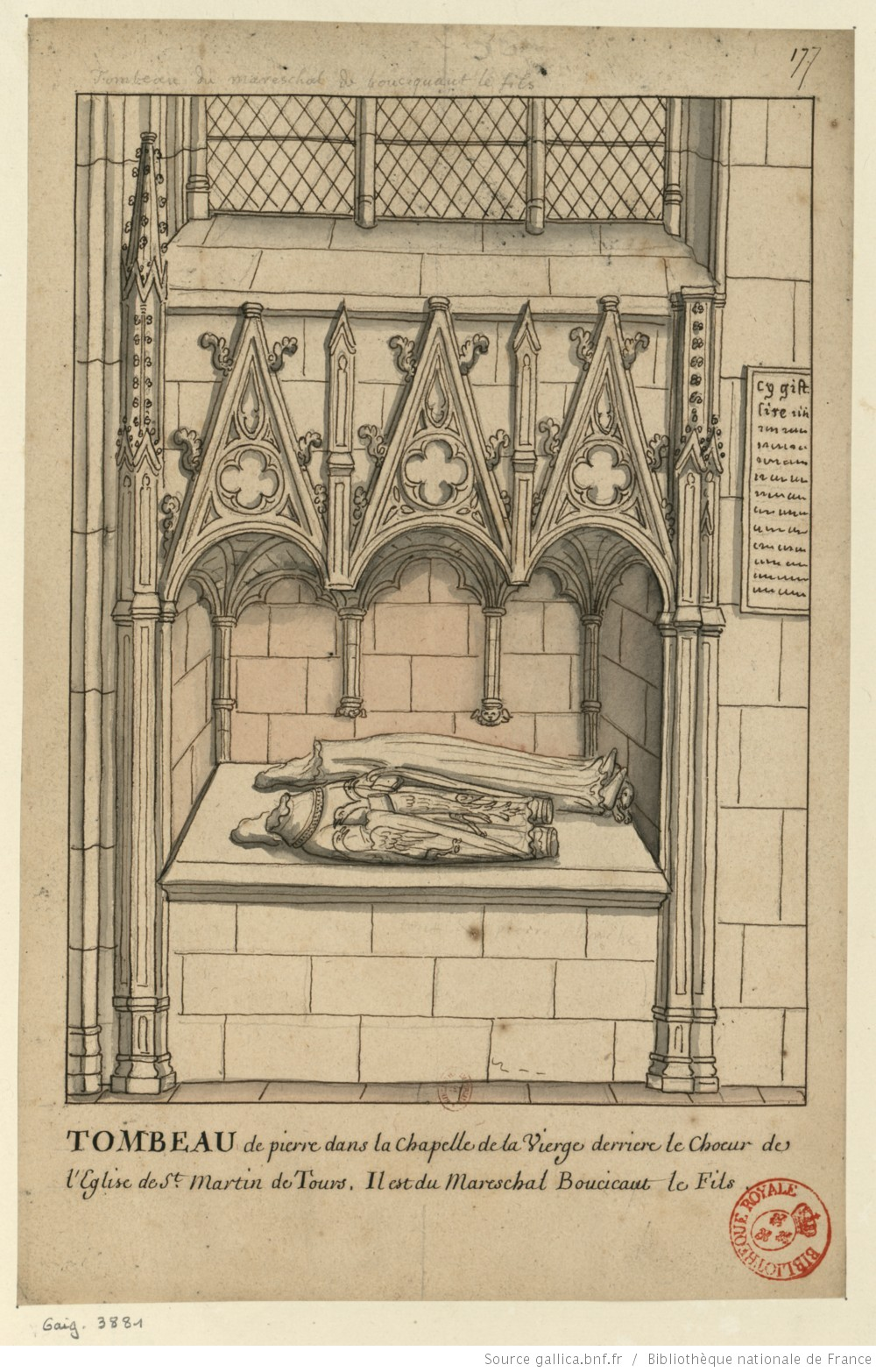
Representation of the tomb of Jean II Le Meingre, known as Boucicaut, former basilica of Saint-Martin de Tours.

The abbey's financial situation in the 15th century was a real cause for concern: around 1450, faced with major building repairs, it was only able to contribute 30 sous to a request for financial aid from the abbot general of Cîteaux, and was repeatedly exempted from various taxes and contributions. From this time on - and the situation would persist over the centuries - conflicts arose between the monks of the abbey and the secular clergy of the parish of Loché, each anxious to preserve their prerogatives in the areas of processions, feasts, burials, but above all with regard to the taxes to be levied.

The most recent studies (1998-1999) and the re-reading of ancient texts suggest that the first church, whose nave has survived into the 21st century, was disused at a relatively early date (14th or 15th century) and refurbished on several levels with the construction of floors; the installation of a stone sink shows that its new use was domestic. In place of the transept and nave, another, larger abbey church was built, the layout of which is unknown; it has almost completely disappeared. The reasons for this transfer of the place of worship have yet to be defined, as the dilapidated state of the original building does not seem to be a valid reason. Moreover, no formal link has been established between the restructuring and any damage caused by the Hundred Years' War.

According to an ancient tradition, the abbey church was the tomb of Jean II Le Meingre, known as Maréchal de Boucicaut or de Boucicault, who died in 1421. Jacques-Xavier Carré de Busserolle even states that, "according to tradition", the tomb was destroyed in 1789 and the bones buried in a pit. Most authors agree, however, that Boucicaut was buried in the Basilica of Saint-Martin in Tours, where his tomb is described in the choir's axial chapel. Other historians support a third theory, that the body was buried in the Basilica of Saint-Martin after the heart had been removed and deposited in Beaugerais.

=== Commendation regime ===
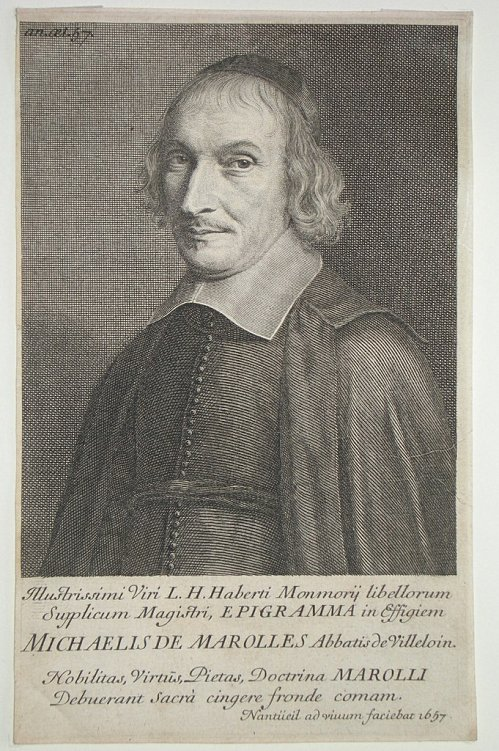
Michel de Marolles

Like almost all abbeys at the same time, towards the end of the Middle Age, the Beaugerais abbey came under the commende regime, probably in 1473. This new regime was generally unfavorable to abbeys whose commendatory abbots, whether religious or lay, used part of the community's income for their own purposes; as they were not resident on site, they generally delegated to the prior the task of de facto administration of the abbey.

One of the few mentions of the Wars of Religion in the history of Loché-sur-Indrois concerns Beaugerais: Claude de la Rue, abbot commendataire appointed in 1552, converted to Protestantism in 1560, but only relinquished his office a few years later. Michel de Marolles was only nine years old when he was appointed in 1609, and it was probably his family who managed the abbey during his childhood. As an adult, and although he was abbot commendatory, he took his task very seriously, at least initially: it was he who ordered the reconstruction of part of the buildings. Around this time, at least six or seven monks lived at the abbey (Michel de Marolles mentions a dormitory with ten cells), a number which fell to three at the beginning of the 18th century. The Beaugerais abbey is geographically close to the Benedictine abbey of Saint-Sauveur de Villeloin (10 km as the crow flies) and these two monasteries, although belonging to different orders, have the distinction of having, from 1626 onwards, the same commendatory abbot in the person of Michel de Marolles. However, he soon seemed to abandon Beaugerais in favor of Villeloin, an abbey where the worldly abbot, who liked to associate with the nobility, felt more at ease.

=== Revolution and the end of the abbey ===
Coat of arms of Beaugerais Abbey in the 18th century.

In 1762, the total income of Beaugerais Abbey was 7,300 livres per year, while that of Villeloin amounted to 18,000 livres per year; twelve years later, the abbots commendataires of these two establishments received 2,000 and 4,000 livres per year respectively. At the time of the Revolution, Beaugerais Abbey was closed - after an inventory of the apparently reduced furniture, the seals were affixed on November 12, 1790 - and the last two monks, aged seventy-one (the prior) and fifty-five, left the abbey in exchange for a pension; in any case, it was no longer possible for them to support the monastery. The buildings were sold as biens nationaux in 1792 and bought back by the former prior, who died before he could benefit from them. In 1799, the new owner transformed the abbey into a farm, after most of the buildings had been demolished and their stones reused in surrounding constructions. The church was even unsuccessfully excavated in search of a hypothetical treasure, before the vaults were demolished.

Beaugerais Abbey is listed under number CCCCXXI (421) by Leopold Janauschek in his 1877 work Originum Cisterciensium, a nomenclature of Cistercian abbeys.

The nave of the first church and the remains of a cloister gallery have been listed as monuments historique since January 17, 1938. Beaugerais Abbey is the only one of Touraine's three Cistercian abbeys to have preserved part of its abbey church.

== Description and architecture ==
Proposed schematic plan of Beaugerais Abbey

There are no plans of the abbey prior to its destruction, nor are there any early illustrations of the abbey. Abbé Michel Bourderioux proposed a reconstruction in 1984, based on Michel de Marolles' descriptions of the abbey in the 17th century, but apart from the abbey church and cloister, none of the other features can be identified with any certainty. Two documents dated 1678, inspection reports and estimates for building repairs, also give a partial description of the facilities.

Despite the paucity of written sources and the scarcity of in situ remains, the buildings of Beaugerais Abbey seem to have been organized in the usual way for a Cistercian abbey, according to a plan that combines a spiritual pole (abbey church, cloister, strictly monastic buildings) to the southwest with a unit that allows the abbey's economic life and the reception of visitors around a bailey to the northeast.

Examination of the Napoleonic cadastre (1831) and the modern cadastre (2014) shows that the buildings have changed very little in the intervening years.

=== Abbeys ===
The first abbey church was dedicated to Notre-Dame. It does not follow the traditional east-west orientation but, exploiting the natural topography of the site, its choir faces north-east; it occupies the highest part of the site. Only the remains of the nave of the first abbey church (11th or 13th century) are still standing and can be described with any certainty.

The second abbey church, dating from the 14th century, almost completely disappeared after the French Revolution, having been dismantled by purchasers of this bien national.

==== Nave of the first abbey church ====
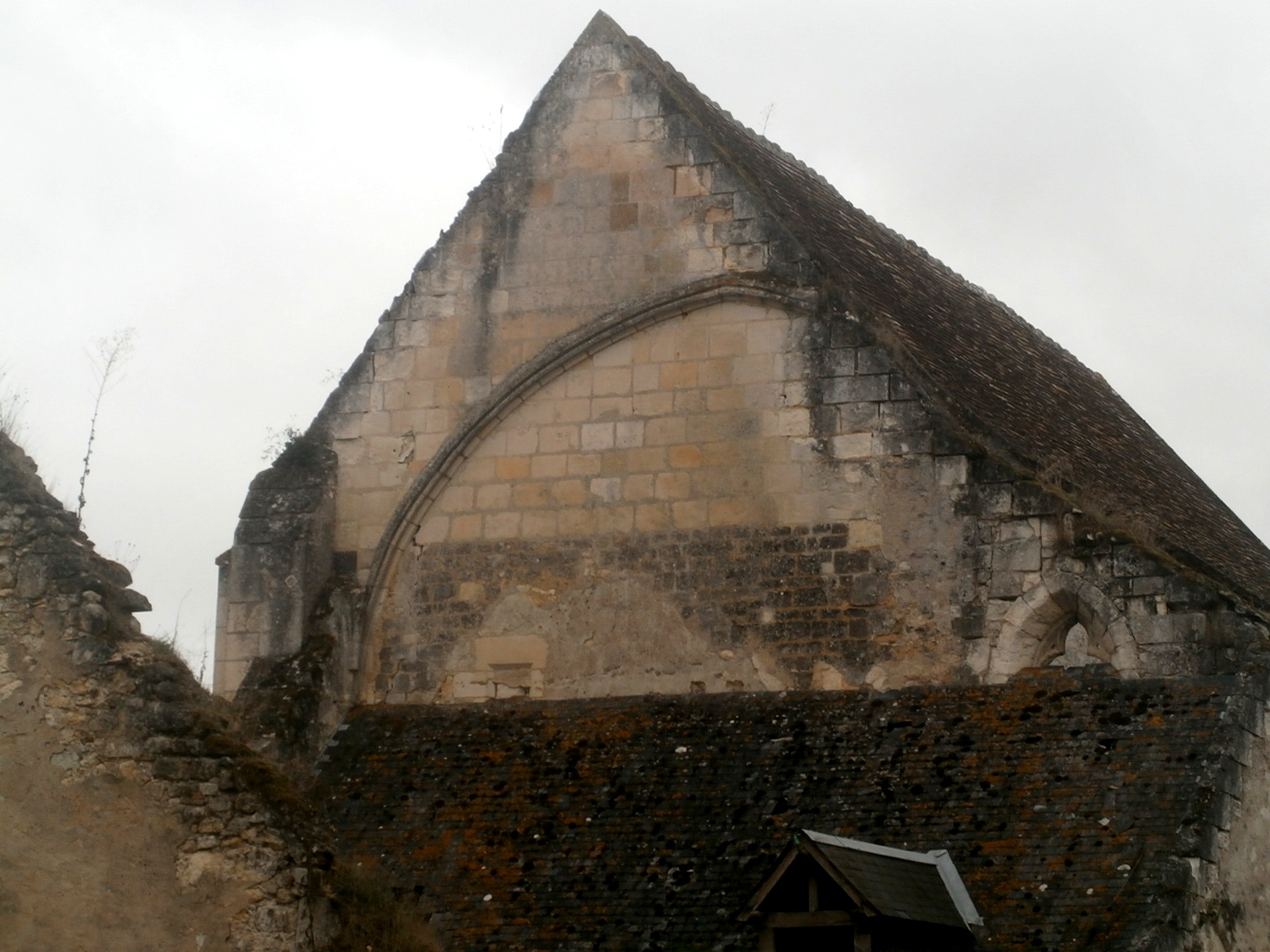
The north-east gable of the former medieval nave.

Plan simplifié des vestiges des abbatiales de Beaugerais.

The contemporary nave was built at the end of the 11th or beginning of the 13th century, a hypothesis based on the correspondence between written sources and the architectural style of the capitals. It comprises three bays of slightly differing lengths, punctuated by exterior buttresses. At least one additional bay would have extended it to the west, but in its current configuration, it is 18 m long and less than 8 m wide. The gutter walls are just under a metre thick, except in the southernmost bay, where they are 1.20 m thick; this disparity is not explained. The masonry of the walls is a blend of the original regular medium-structure and irregular rubble stone from the restoration campaigns that lasted until the 20th century. The height of the nave is now divided into three levels and an attic, and the interior of the building has been significantly altered by the construction of new wooden floors and dividing walls. However, examination of the vaults confirms that the nave must have extended to the west and east.

Each gutter wall is pierced by round-arched bays, one per bay, some of which are partially or completely walled in; these bays are not all set into the walls at the same height. In the second bay, on the south-east side, a door provided access to the cloister. Each nave bay is vaulted with a curved ribbed cross vault, the joints of which were highlighted with red and yellow ochre; the vault supports, engaged pillars, are higher on the north side, and this asymmetry cannot be explained. A tiled gable roof and a hipped roof on the south-west side complete the edifice.

While the general plan of Beaugerais seems to conform to the usual layout of Cistercian abbeys, the plan of the abbey church, with its single elongated but relatively narrow nave, seems to be closer to Grandmont's constructions; the austerity of the decoration reinforces this impression - the capitals on which the vaults rest and a saw-tooth molded band running under the bays are the only decorative elements in the abbey church. The vaulting, on the other hand, seems to make use of the Angevin Gothic style in a way unprecedented for a Cistercian building.

==== Potential remains of the second abbey church ====
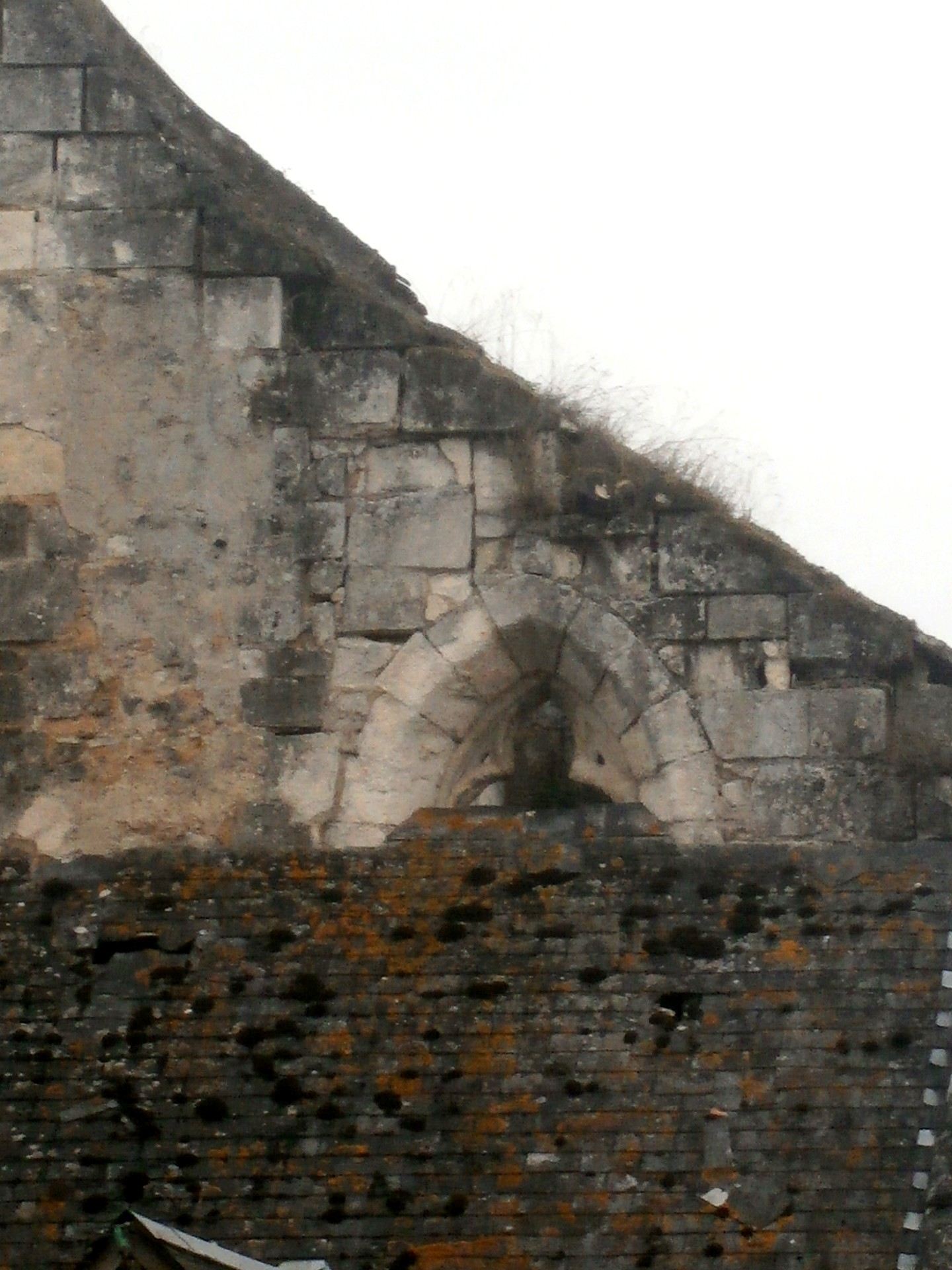
Third-point bay at the northeast end of the nave.

While the nave of the first abbey church, albeit modified, has been preserved, its transept and choir have disappeared, and the details of their construction are unknown. According to Michel Bourderioux's interpretation, a few rare remains could be linked to them: a pointed arch on the northeast gable of the nave, a third-point bay in the extension and then the beginning of a corner return wall. These would appear to be those of the nave and aisle of the second abbey church, built in the late 14th or early 15th century on the site of the transept and choir of the first building. Michel de Marolles specifies that this "new'' church is "[...] based on a cross in the form of several of the Order of Cisteaux, is fourteen toises long and four wide inside by seven high" (27 × 8 m for a height of over 13 m). A slate-and-timbered bell tower, housing two bells at the time of the French Revolution, was to be built over the nave of this new abbey church.

The precise layout of this new abbey church is unknown; however, it is highly probable, based on the rare remains, that its nave, of which two bays are still discernible, was built as a continuation of the previous one, but was enlarged by the addition of side aisles.

=== Cloister ===
All that remains of this layout are four pillars forming part of the northern gallery, against the south-east eaves wall of the abbey church; these pillars, massive in medium thickness and mounted on a small rubble wall, still bear part of the gallery's lean-to roof, which rested on corbels in the nave's eaves wall. This may be the result of the reorganization of the cloister ordered by Michel de Marolles, who had its dimensions reduced. Although this interpretation raises architectural questions, the dimensions of the cloister estimated from the archaeological remains do not correspond to those indicated by Michel de Marolles.

=== Other convent facilities ===
Known only from written sources, such as those of Michel de Marolles, the buildings have been proposed for reconstruction, but there is no evidence of their location or use. Only a small, recent pavilion with a bread oven remains; the other buildings mentioned are the dormitory and the boiler room - perhaps built as an extension of the south transept - the kitchen, the prior's lodgings and annex buildings, probably around the cloister. Michel de Marolles situated his abbot's dwelling, comprising "two upper and two lower rooms with their closets", in the southern part of the monastery enclosure, perhaps independent of the other buildings. A garden, also mentioned by Michel de Marolles, is located in the southern part of the enclosure.

To the northeast of the abbey enclosure, various buildings were erected between the 11th and 18th centuries, including barns, stables, a mill, a bakery and a small chapel dedicated to St. John, which was intended for visitors and underwent repairs in the 17th century. The layout of these destroyed buildings is unknown, but the modern buildings erected on their sites still show the layout.

One of the buildings, perhaps the guest quarters, was destroyed by fire in 1693 and rebuilt in the early 18th century.

Two cemeteries appear to have existed: one within the monastic enclosure, reserved for the monks - some prominent figures even obtained permission to be buried in the abbey church itself - and the other outside, perhaps a few dozen meters to the northwest near the "métairie des Loges" buildings, where visitors and pilgrims were buried.

== The abbey's influence ==
The Cistercian abbey of Beaugerais is a small one, inhabited by a small number of monks. There is no formal evidence to suggest that it had a major spiritual influence in southern Touraine, as did its Benedictine neighbors at Villeloin and the Cartusian abbey at Le Liget. No priories are known to have depended on the abbey. The only building outside the abbey itself that can be attributed to the monks of Beaugerais has not a spiritual but a purely logistical function: it is the Gratte-Paille farm, 2.5 km south of Beaugerais, a Cistercian barn attached to the abbey probably shortly after its foundation. No other building with the same function is attested in the south of the department.

However, the existence of buildings, including a chapel, and a cemetery reserved for visitors seems to indicate that Beaugerais exerted an influence on neighboring populations, of a nature and within a perimeter that it is not possible to define. It is also stated that in the 17th century "processions and an annual fair attracted large numbers of people on certain days".

== Abbés de Beaugerais ==
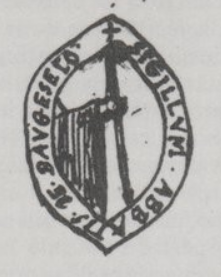
Seal of the abbots of Baugerais in the 12th and 13th centuries.

According to available sources, since joining the Cîteaux Order, thirty-five abbots have succeeded each other as abbot of Beaugerais, nineteen as abbot regular from 1173 to 1472, sixteen as commendatory abbot from 1473 to 1790, two of the latter having served two terms separated by an interruption.

Some of the commendatory abbots were laymen. Claude de la Rue, for his part, has the distinction of having been, for at least four years between 1560 and 1564, at the head of a Catholic abbey, even though he was Protestant. Three of the Beaugerais abbots also depended on the Louroux abbey, which can be explained by the special links between the two establishments. For some Beaugerais abbots, the dates of their abbatiate are unknown; for others, only a date during their term of office is attested.

In the 12th and 13th centuries, the abbots of Beaugerais all used the same shuttle seal, depicting an arm emerging from a sleeve, holding a crozier and bearing the inscription "+ SIGILLVM.ABATTIS.DE.BEAVGESEIO". (seal of Abbé de Beaugerais).

== Recent historical and archaeological studies ==
Three studies carried out in the second half of the 20th century shed light on the history and architecture of Beaugerais.

In 1970-71, historian Don Guy-Marie Oury set out to study the religious foundations of eremitical origin in Indre-et-Loire, including Beaugerais Abbey, whose early history he described through an analysis of written archives. The study was published in the journal Mabillon.

In 1984, Abbé Michel Bourderioux, historian and parish priest of Loché-sur-Indrois, published a long article on the history and architecture of the abbey in the Bulletin de la Société archéologique de Touraine (SAT).

In 1998-1999, Franck Tournadre, as part of his master's thesis in art history and archaeology on the Cistercian abbeys of Touraine, carried out a refined archaeological study of the abbey and a re-reading of ancient texts, enabling him to review the chronology of the abbey and the layout of its architecture; although his thesis was not published in full, he summarized the main information in an article that also appeared in the SAT bulletin in 2000.

== See also ==
- Cistercians
- List of Cistercian monasteries in France
- Louroux Abbey

== Bibliography ==
=== Publications dedicated entirely or partially to Beaugerais Abbey ===
- Bourderioux, Michel (1984). "L'abbaye de Baugerais (Loché-sur-Indrois)". Bulletin de la Société archéologique de Touraine. XL: 961–1001.
- Ranjard, Robert (1937). "L'église abbatiale de Beaugerais". Bulletin de la Société archéologique de Touraine. XXVI: 359–362.
- Tournadre, Franck (1999). "Les vestiges de trois abbayes cisterciennes dans le diocèse de Tours : Baugerais, Fontaines-les-Blanches, La Clarté-Dieu; étude archéologique". Mémoire de maîtrise de l'Histoire de l'Art et d'Archéologie du Moyen-Âge. 1 (2). Tours: Université François-Rabelais.
- Tournadre, Franck (2000). "Les vestiges cisterciens dans le diocèse de Tours, - Les abbayes de Baugerais et de Fontaines-les-Blanches". Bulletin de la Société archéologique de Touraine. XLVI: 225–253.

=== Publications on Touraine history ===
- Couderc, Jean-Mary (1987). Dictionnaire des communes de Touraine. Chambray-lès-Tours: C.L.D. ISBN 2-85443-136-7.
- Lorans, Élisabeth (1996). Le Lochois du Haut Moyen Âge au xiiie siècle - territoires, habitats et paysages. Tours: Publication de l'Université de Tours. ISBN 2-86906-092-0.
- Oury, Guy-Marie (1971). "L'érémitisme dans l'ancien diocèse de Tours au xiie siècle". Revue Mabillon. LVIII (244).
- Ranjard, Robert (1986). La Touraine archéologique : guide du touriste en Indre-et-Loire (9th ed.). Mayenne: Imprimerie de la Manutention. ISBN 2-855-54017-8.
