= Abbey of Saint-Sauveur, Villeloin =

Benedictine abbey, Indre-et-Loire, France

Coordinates: 47.1409°N 1.2215°E

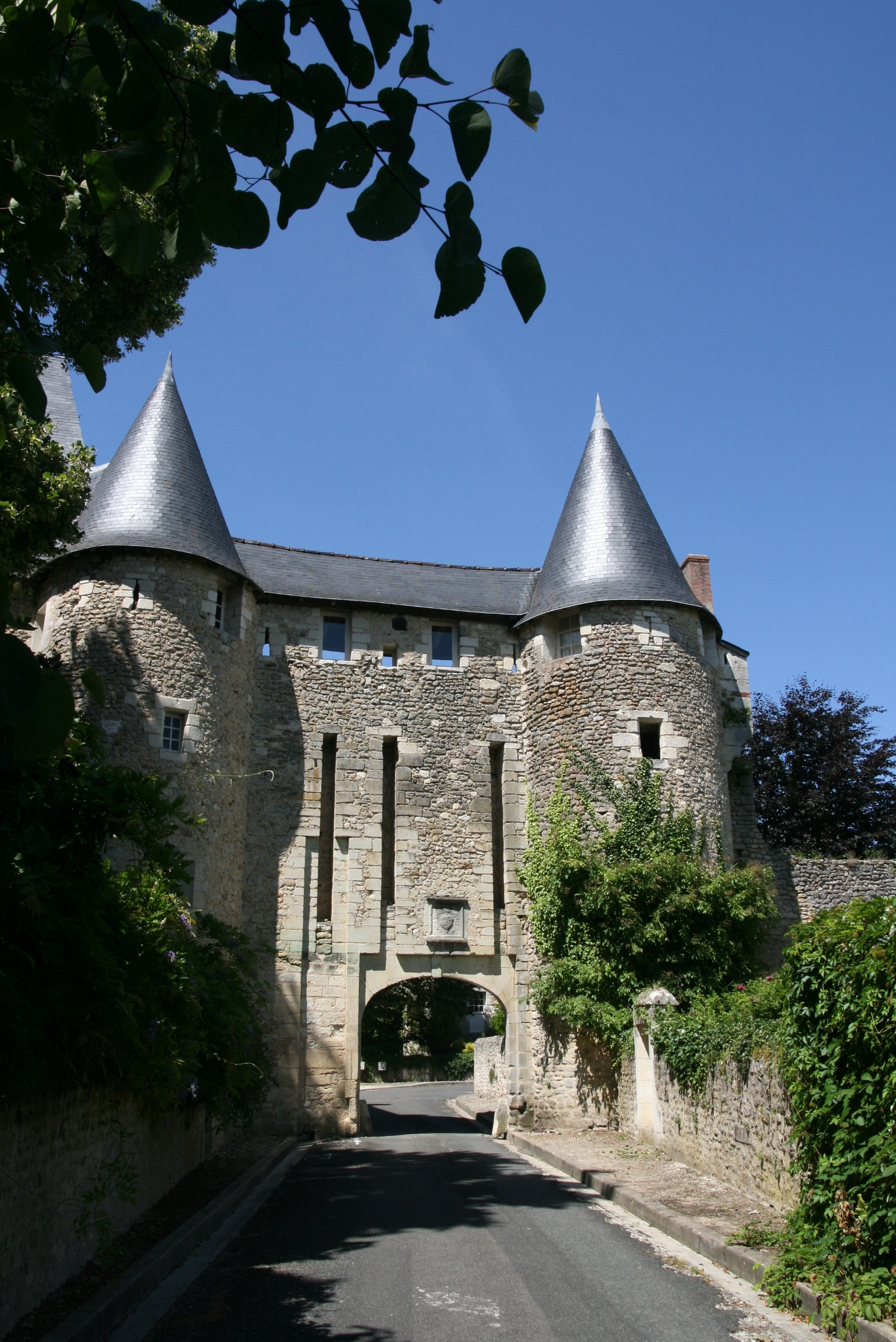

Religion
- Affiliation: Catholic Church
- Diocese: Villeloin-Coulangé
- Province: Indre-et-Loire
- Region: Centre-Val de Loire

Location
- Country: France

Architecture
- Established: 850

The Abbey of Saint-Sauveur, Villeloin (French: Abbaye Saint-Sauveur de Villeloin), also known as Villeloin Abbey, is a former Benedictine monastery located in Villeloin-Coulangé, in the French department of Indre-et-Loire. It was founded during the ninth century by two knights, Mainard and Mainerius. The abbey was destroyed by English troops in 1360 and again in 1412.

The abbey became prosperous thanks to numerous donations and was important in terms of the number of monks and land holdings. On August 11, 1301, during his visit to Loches, King Philip the Fair stayed there.

The abbey was left in ruins by the French Revolution.

In 1921, two crosiers were discovered during excavations. Their presence in the environment of Villeloin Abbey gives an indication of the original location of the ninth-century foundation. These two objects, especially the enamelled crosier, were precious, very expensive and seem to indicate that their owners were abbots of some renown.

The abbey has been listed as a monument historique since 1927, by four different decrees. The church dates from the 12th century. The former priory, Renaissance pavilion and towers date from the 16th century. The former conventual building dates from the 17th century. The former church was listed by decree of March 18, 1927; the façade and 17th-century portal of the former conventual building and the door of the former chapel were listed by decree of May 20, 1927; the former priory with Renaissance pavilion and turret, the large entrance portal, the two towers of the drawbridge and the tower to the east of the drawbridge were listed by decree of May 20, 1927; and the Renaissance pavilion and large square tower were listed by decree of May 20, 1927.

== History of the abbey ==
=== Foundation ===
The knight Mainard intended to found a monastery, as is written in the cartulary of Cormery Abbey, in pago videlicet Turonico, super fluvium cui nomen est Andrisco in loco qui dicitur, rustico vocàbulo, Villalupa ("namely, in Touraine, on the river whose name is Andrisco, in the place called by the rustic name of Villalupa").". According to a diploma from Louis the Pious, in the time of Charles II the Bald and in his own time, the brothers Mainard and Mainerius gave Audacher, abbot of Cormery, a place called Villeloin to build a new monastery in honor of the Holy Savior. However, it could not have been issued by Louis the Pious, as Charles the Bald survived him. This charter may therefore be considered apocryphal. Nevertheless, Mainard and Mainerius were indeed the founders of Villeloin, and it was Abbot Audacher who presided over its construction. It was built during the reign of Charles the Bald, who in 850 gave his approval and placed it under the authority of Cormery Abbey (also run by Benedictines). Once completed, the basilica church was consecrated by Archbishop Herard in 859, who decided, with Audacher's consent, that there should be at least twenty monks in the monastery. In the same way that Cormery depended on the Abbey of Saint-Martin in Tours, Villeloin was dependent on Cormery, and was initially run by the abbots of Cormery.

=== Important events ===
In 965, the monks of Villeloin begged Guy d'Anjou, abbot of Cormery, to allow them to elect their own abbot, which he granted, and they elected Huncbertus, who was consecrated by Archbishop Hardouin.

After 1060 Fulk III, Count of Anjou, granted Villeloin customs "in villa Hispaniacus, etc.". His warlord Lisois d'Amboise is buried in the abbey church. In 1156, Pope Adrian IV confirmed their possessions, as did Pope Innocent IV in 1253.

In 1301, King Philip IV approved Charles the Bald's diploma. On August 11, 1301, during his trip to Loches, King Philip the Fair stayed in the abbey: "Later, a brilliant and numerous procession entered Villeloin, leaving the next day and crossing the forest to go to Loches; it was King Philippe le Bel, accompanied by his royal wife, Jeanne de Navarre, Countess of Champagne, Bric and Bigorre, daughter of Henri I, King of Navarre. The prince and princess stayed eight days in Loches and returned via Villeloin".

Important gifts are also known that served as the economic basis for the community's life, notably that of the La Béraudière estate made in 1335 by Ingelger d'Amboise. A fine tithe barn still exists, outside the boundaries of the abbey, depicted in the 17th-century engraving.

Like many monasteries Villeloin suffered during the Hundred Years' War. The English seized it in 1360, establishing in it a large garrison that spread throughout the country. In 1361, the monks succeeded in buying back their abbey from the occupiers for the substantial sum of 9,000 gold florins. Most of the ransom was paid by Gautier de Châteauchallons, a close associate of the Count of Auxerre. It was therefore a case of royal political intervention. This practice of buying back buildings and prisoners was common at the time.

The monastery buildings were devastated in 1412 by English troops. In the same year, the monks obtained permission from King Charles VI that the watch and guard of the abbey should be taken over by the inhabitants, who had previously performed these duties on behalf of Loches.

By the early 15th century, the buildings were in a very poor state of repair. Reconstruction began in 1417, but it was mainly after the Hundred Years' War, in 1464, that the fortifications were rebuilt for use during the Wars of Religion.

In 1664, Michel de Marolles, abbot of Villeloin, assembled a veritable treasure trove in his library. He had 150 coats of arms painted, representing Europe's major cities and luminaries. He collected 123,400 prints (including over 200 by Rembrandt) and over 400 large volumes.

In 1667, with the consent of de Marolles, monks from the Congregation of Saint Maur entered the monastery to establish the reform, which did not really take effect until January 1, 1669.

The abbey was suppressed during the French Revolution in 1790 and the abbey's last four Benedictine monks departed (Emmanuel Charpentier the prior, Maurice Vallère, François Lecoq and Jean-Louis de Maussabré, the monks)). The monastery premises were left to various purchasers of biens nationaux. Each of them, in order to close themselves off from their neighbors, built walls using materials from the demolished buildings. The church was destroyed shortly after the Revolution.

=== The abbey's annals from 1464 to 1629: Pierre Brunet ===
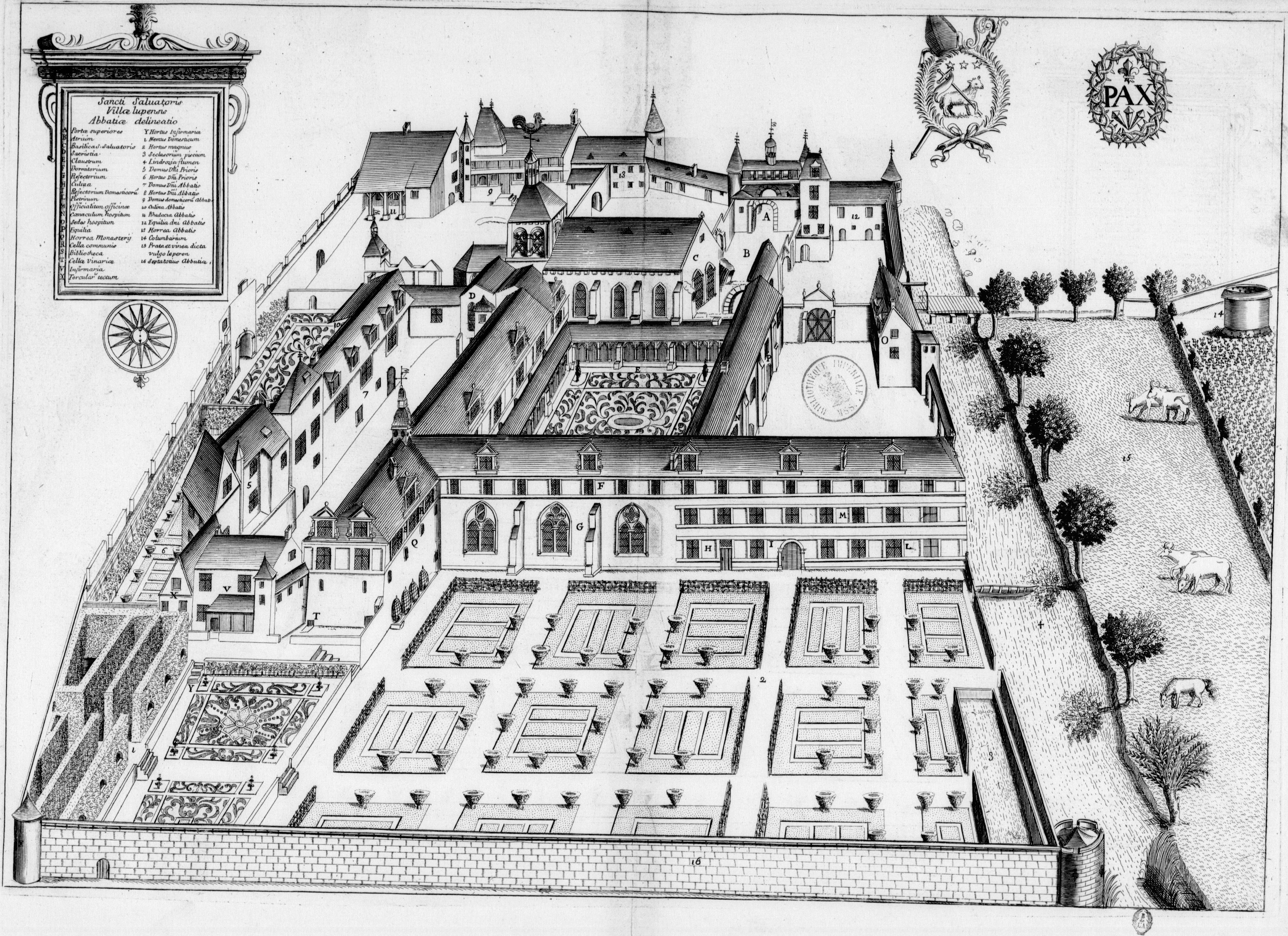
Monasticon Gallicanum - plan of the former abbey in the 17th century

The annals of Villeloin Abbey, from 1464 to 1629, are known precisely from a manuscript written there.

The library of Tours holds an unnamed manuscript written in the 17th century, transcribed by a copyist under the very eyes of its author Pierre Brunet, whose name appears repeatedly in the manuscript and whose monogram appears at the head of the work.

Pierre Brunet, a Benedictine monk of Villeloin, successively held various positions in the abbey. After spending some time at the Priory of Grandmont-Villiers, Brunet was received as a novice at Villeloin on February 20, 1588; and, as he was recognized as having solid intellectual qualities, he was given the task of teaching grammar, which he did for four years. On February 26 of the following year, he was admitted to the Benedictine monk. Brunet celebrated his first mass on August 5, 1590, and his active mind and sound judgment led to him being asked on several occasions to take on difficult missions to defend the rights of the abbey, particularly in Paris and Tours. On January 20, 1605, he was appointed to the "office de prevosté" and, a little later, to the "scribe du chapitre", a position he held until 1612.

In this capacity, under the abbot's direction, Brunet classified and copied the various title deeds of the monastery, which he collected in several carefully bound volumes, a task he had to interrupt due to illness. On March 22, 1613, he was chosen as sacristan, which led him to draw up the terrier (land register) of the property belonging to the sacristy, then of that belonging to the sub-priory, not without clarifying the various rights. Meanwhile, in 1617, his devotion led him to copy the book of spiritual doctrine by Saint Stephen of Muret, founder of the Grandmontineæ order, which manuscript appears to be that in the Tours library. The abbots, whom he often accompanied on their travels, successively entrusted him with the care of delicate affairs, or of winning the good graces of the most important figures. These testimonials of confidence were crowned by his appointment in May 1622 to the dignity of prior, which established him as the monastic director of the abbey, with the commendatory abbots taking particular care of temporal matters.

In this role, Brunet brought the spirit of piety and regularity that had marked his entire career. In everything, he set the perfect example of a religious man. On more than one occasion, he did not hesitate to make his conscience heard when the interests of religious or the dignity of monastic life were not sufficiently respected and protected. With his noble, disinterested spirit, truly enamored of the beauty of the ascetic life in its highest sense, Brunet served well both his convent and the Benedictine order in general.

Brunet, with his distinguished and carefully ornamented intelligence, combined his taste for historical research with a knowledge of antiquity, and was very familiar with the classics. His first task was to write a simple, unpretentious history of the abbey, based on the documents kept in the muniment room and his personal recollections, under the title of "Mémoire". The first event refers to the year 1464, and the chronicle ends with the year 1629. In addition to recounting events relating to conventual life, Brunet took special care to note the arts and the work carried out in the abbey and its outbuildings, making a valuable contribution to the artistic history of the region. The festivities, the visits of people of quality, the sumptuous existence of the abbots, the picture of feudal and rural life, the curious incidents, the thousand details of each day, give this account a very special interest. In addition, it frequently reflects public events and the deeds of several princes and great lords, especially in their dealings with the abbey.

Brunet's temperament and culture attracted the attention of the Abbé de Marolles. The learned abbot was very fond of his prior and, in accordance with his remarks, was grateful for his excellent dispositions, particularly in his "laborious writings, and especially in the great Inventory of all the titles of the House of Nevers". Brunet's chronicle is therefore a mine of precious information, which can be considered as an introduction to the Memoirs of the Abbé de Marolles.

Here is the title of this memoir: "Mémoire de plusieurs bastiments, reparations, dons et actes mémorables faictz tant par les Reverends abbés de ceste abbaye de Villeloing que religieux d'icelle depuis deus cents ans. 1629. ".

It is not known when Brunet died or why he did he not continue writing his chronicle. Perhaps the reason lay in his proximity to the Abbé de Marolles. Knowing the abbot's intention to write a general history of Touraine, Brunet did not see fit to continue.

== The abbey's possessions ==
1207. Geoffroi de la Lande, archbishop of Tours, acknowledges the donation by Sulpice, lord of Amboise, of the island of Amboise to the monks of Villeloin.

1253. Pope Innocent IV confirms possession "de Chedigne" (Chédigny), "Chisseyo" (Chissay-en-Touraine), "Chedon" (Saint-Julien-de-Chédon), "Colengeio" (Coulangé), "Francolio" (Francueil), "Locheio" (Loches), "Marioli" (Mareuil-sur-Cher), "Montistessauri" (Montrésor), "Sivraia" (Civray-sur-Cher, now Civray-de-Touraine), "Suer" (Le Serrain, now in Semblançay) and the church "de Espeigneio" (Épeigné-les-Bois).

1255. Pope Innocent IV confirms the donations and possessions of Villeloin Abbey "de Nogento" (Nouans-les-Fontaines).

The priories of Épeigné, Francueil, Saint-Martin-de-Verton, Saint-Sauveur d'Amboise, Saint-Pantaléon-de-Sur, Luçay-le-Mâle, Cros, Vou and Saint-Médard were dependent on Villeloin Abbey.

== Abbots ==
List of abbots of Villeloin Abbey from 965 to 1789
List based on Dictionnaire géographique, historique et biographique d'Indre-et-Loire et de l'ancienne province de Touraine, by Jacques-Xavier Carré de Busserolle.
| N° | Beginning of abbacy | End of abbacy | Abbot |
| 1 | 965 | 966 | Guy |
| 2 | 966 | - | Humbert |
| 3 | - | - | Étienne – died around 1034. |
| 4 | - | - | Geoffroy – appears in a charter of 1060. |
| 5 | 1081 | - | Renaut |
| 6 | - | - | Geoffroy – mentioned in a charter from Saint-Julien abbey in 1091. |
| 7 | 1105 | - | Eude |
| 8 | 1140 | - | Renault |
| 9 | 1156 | - | Aimery |
| 10 | 1164 | - | Hervé |
| 11 | 1180 | - | Arnoul |
| 12 | 1190 | - | Hugues |
| 13 | 1200 | - | Gérard |
| 14 | 1220 | - | Renault |
| 15 | 1229 | - | Jean (In a charter by Geoffroy de Palluau -1229- and in a charter by Dreux de Mello -1230-) |
| 16 | 1232 | - | Gérard |
| 17 | 1238 | - | Thomas |
| 18 | - | - | Michel, died January 5, 1246 |
| 19 | 1248 | - | Robert |
| 20 | 1270 | - | Archambault, died around 1288 |
| 21 | 1293 | - | Jean |
| 22 | 1290 | - | Geoffroy Donil |
| 23 | 1308 | - | Jean du Mesnil |
| 24 | 1320 | 1339 | Hugues de Maraffin de Notz |
| 25 | 1341 | 1352 | Jehan Gastineau (cited in charters of 1341, 1343, 1347 and 1352) |
| 26 | May, 135 | - | Philippe Rigot de Luc, prior of Épeigné, died around 1357 |
| 27 | December 20, 1357 | - | Pierre, was still alive in 1377 |
| 28 | 1386 | 1414 | Bertrand de la Marche, died in 1414 |
| 29 | 1414 | - | Pierre Alain, mentioned in deeds of 1416, 1431, 1437 and 1438 |
| 30 | 1438 | - | Simon de Coucy (or Confis), died in 1471 |
| 31 | 1463 | - | Jean Geoffroy, died in 1471 |
| 32 | 1475 | 1483 | Jean de Barasc de Beduer, died May 31, 1495 |
| 33 | 1493 | - | Antoine de Barasc de Beduer, died in 1518 |
| 34 | 1519 | - | Jacques le Roy de Chavigny, became archbishop of Bourges, died 1572 |
| 35 | 1551 | 1557 | Robert de Lenoncourt, bishop, archbishop and cardinal, died February 2, 1561 |
| 36 | 1557 | - | Jean de la Rochefoucault, abbot of Villeloin, Cormery and Marmoutier died in 1583 |
| 37 | 1584 | - | Pierre Roussel |
| 38 | 1585 | 1597 | Antoine de Bruyères de Chalabre, Abbot of Fontaine-les-Blanches Abbey |
| 39 | 1597 | 1607 | Achille de Harlay de Sancy, became bishop of Saint-Malo, died November 26, 1646 |
| 40 | 1607 | 1626 | Gaillard de Cornac, died December 2, 1626 |
| 41 | December 5, 1626 | 1674 | Michel de Marolles |
| 42 | 1674 | 1709 | Gilles Brunet, chaplain of Sainte-Chapelle-de-Paris, died in 1709 |
| 43 | December 24, 1709 | 17554 | Justin de Lée, died in 1754 |
| 44 | 1754 | 1789 | Joseph-François-Xavier Rigault. The last abbot of Villeloin |

== Notable abbots ==
=== Robert de Lenoncourt ===
Robert de Lenoncourt (1510 – February 2, 1561), who was abbot of Villeloin between 1551 and 1557, was also Count-Bishop of Châlons-en-Champagne and Metz, Archbishop of Embrun, Bishop of Auxerre, Cardinal-Bishop of Sabina, Archbishop of Arles and Archbishop of Toulouse. He had already been a cardinal since 1538.

=== Achille de Harlay de Sancy ===
Achille de Harlay de Sancy (Paris, 1581 – Saint-Malo, November 26, 1646), baron de Sancy, before becoming bishop of Saint-Malo, was abbot of Villeloin between 1597 and 1607.

=== Michel de Marolles ===
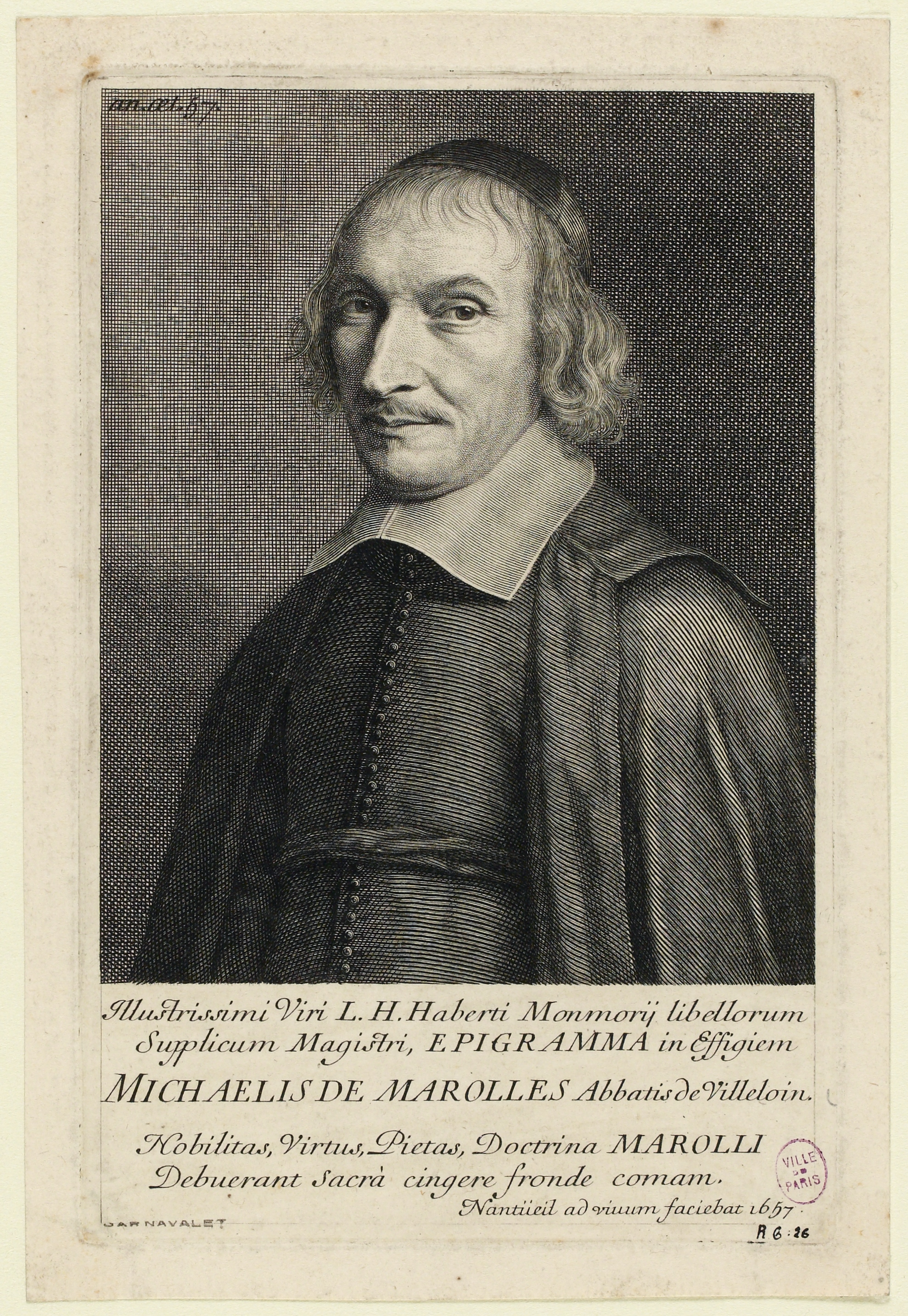
Michel de Marolles – Abbot of Villeloin.

Abbé Michel de Marolles (born in Genillé (Indre-et-Loire) on July 22, 1600; died in Paris on March 6, 1681) was a French translator and historian, renowned for his collection of prints. Tonsured in 1610, he was abbot of Villeloin from 1626 to 1674. Author of numerous verse translations of Latin authors, he was a frequent visitor to salons, notably that of Madeleine de Scudéry. He is best remembered for the collection of prints he amassed: over 120,000 engravings (including more than 200 by Rembrandt), which Colbert bought for King Louis XIV.

== Villeloin Abbey crosiers ==

During work carried out in the Villeloin-Coulangé commune in the early 1920s, two abbot's crosiers were found:

A 13th-century pastoral crozier has been listed as a monument historique since July 9, 1921. It was unearthed by Monsieur Charles Paillaud on February 26, 1921. It was located in a tomb, under the paving of a room that was identified at the time as the former abbey chapter house. This 16 cm (6.3 in) ivory crosier is dated to around the year 1200. It was found associated with the bronze bouterolle (or cuspes) that terminated its shaft. The Musée de Cluny was able to acquire this rare piece in April 1929. It is on display in the museum's ivory room.

A second crosier was unearthed in the same room as the first on July 13, 1921. It is a work of Limoges enamel. It was made around 1220–1235. It is made of pressed copper, medium blue champlevé enamel, engraved and gilded. Its height is 32.7 cm and its width 18 cm. It shows the Coronation of the Virgin in the scroll and the Annunciation on the socket. For many years, it was on display at the Hôtel Goüin museum in Tours, now closed.

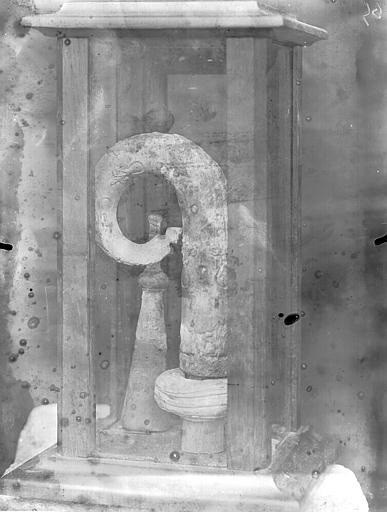
Antique photo (1923) of a 13th-century ivory bishop's crozier.

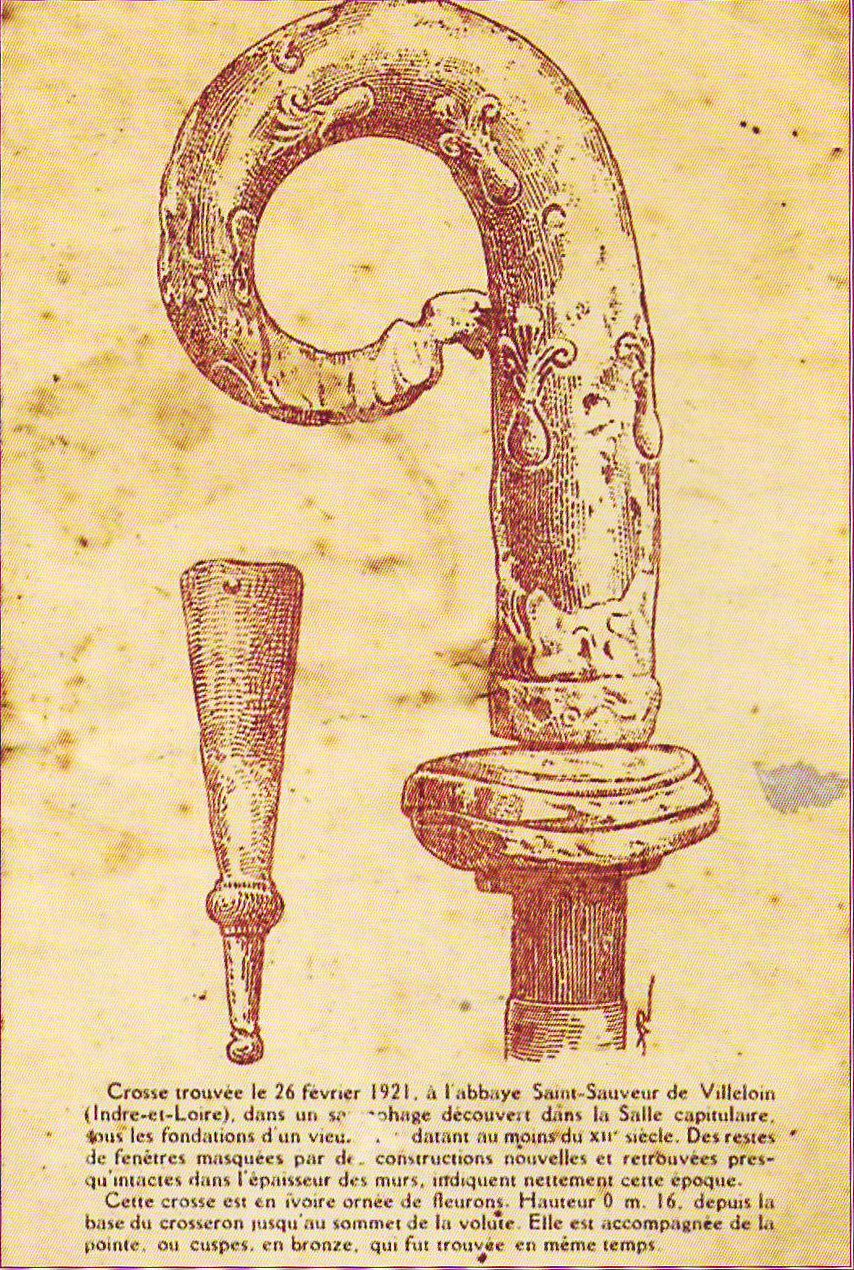
13th-century ivory episcopal crook, 16 cm. It is decorated with fleurons.

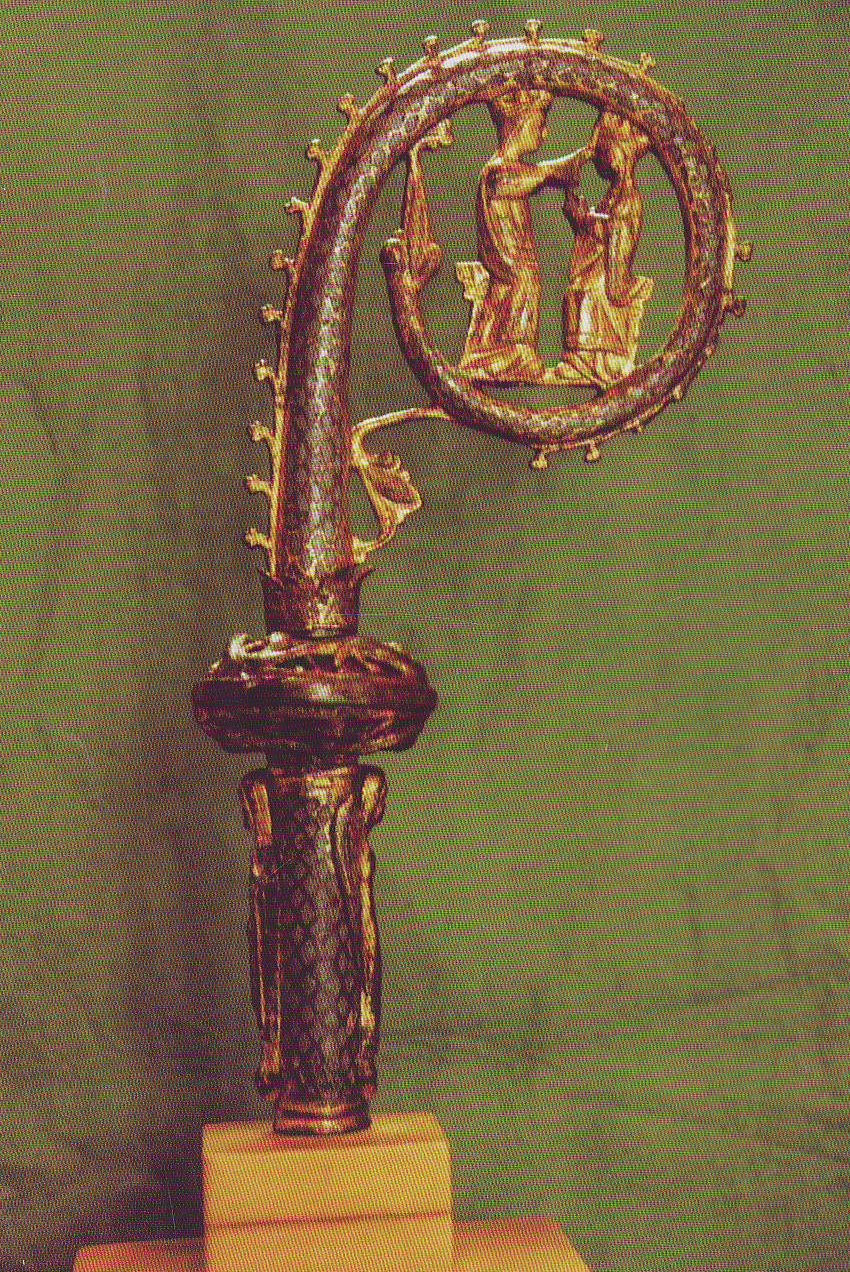
Enameled copper stock from the 13th century. Limousin enamels.

== Heraldry ==
Coat of arms of the Abbey of Saint Sauveur, Villeloin: Azure, a standing figure of the Virgin Mary Or.

Alternative coat of arms of the Abbey of Saint Sauveur, Villeloin: Gules, a cross engrailed Or between four fleurs-de-lis Argent.

== Bibliography ==
- Le Patrimoine des Communes d'Indre et Loire : Centre. Paris: Flohic éditions (published April 2001). 2001. ISBN 2-84234-115-5.
- Briais, Bernard (1984). Loches et la Touraine du sud, Association pour la promotion du tourisme en pays Lochois/C.L.D. Association pour la promotion du tourisme en pays Lochois/C.L.D. p. 158. ISBN 9782854430769.
- Ranjard, R. (1994). La touraine archéologique : Guide du touriste en Indre-et-Loire. Mayenne: Joseph Floch. p. 735. ISBN 2-85554-072-0.
- De Marolles, Michel (1655). Mémoires de Michel de Marolles abbé de Villeloin avec des notes historiques et critiques. Paris. p. 396.
- Germain, Dom Michel. "Matériaux du Monasticon Gallicanum". Sancti Salvatoris Villæ Lupensis abbatiæ delineatio (in Latin).
- "Cartulaire de l'abbaye Saint-Sauveur de Villeloin". Archives du Cogner. H (97) (1911 ed.).
- copie : Bibliothèque Municipale du Mans.
- "Cartulaire de l'abbaye de Saint-Sauveur de Villeloin". Archives du Cogner. H (97). Paris-Le Mans: J. Chappée, Le Mans. 1911.

Dom Grammont

- Grammont, Paul (1991). "Foi vivante". Présence à Dieu, présence aux hommes (in French). Paris: Cerf. p. 261. ISBN 978-2-204-04260-4.

=== Ecumenism ===
- Fouilloux, Étienne (1982). Les Catholiques et l'Unité Chrétienne du XIXe au xxe siècle. Paris: éditions du Centurion. ISBN 978-2-227-31037-7.
- Simon, Monique (1997). La vie monastique, lieu œcuménique dans le cœur de l'Église–communion. Paris: éditions du Cerf. ISBN 978-2-204-05647-2.
- Nouvelle histoire de l'Église. Paris: éditions du Seuil. 1975.

== See also ==
=== Geography ===
- Indre-et-Loire
- Touraine

=== History ===
- Michel de Marolles

=== Politics and administration ===
- Villeloin-Coulangé
- Communauté de communes de Montrésor
