= Louroux Abbey =

Cistercian abbey in Vernantes, France

Cistercian Abbey of Louroux
- Interactive map of Cistercian Abbey of Louroux

Monastery information
- Order: Cistercian
- Established: 1121
- Disestablished: 1791
- Mother house: Cîteaux Abbey
- Diocese: Angers

Site
- Location: Vernantes, France
- Coordinates: 47.421517°N 0.025858°E
- Public access: yes

Louroux Abbey (French: Abbaye de Louroux) was a Cistercian monastery located in Vernantes, Pays de la Loire, France.

== History ==
Louroux Abbey was founded in 1121 by the mother abbey of Cîteaux. The church was consecrated on September 14, 1179 and the abbey was ruled by Cistercians until 1791.

Louroux Abbey had as daughter abbeys Pontrond (1134-1791), Bellebranche (1152-1686), Beaugerais (1172-1791), and Santa Maria della Vittoria (1277-1550).

The property was seized during the Revolution and for thirty years was vacant. Following the Restoration, the property came into private hands and the majority of the historic Abbaye was demolished, leaving vestiges of the old structure in a park-like setting.

A new home was constructed on the site of the former abbot’s residence in the Italian style popular in that period. The home was completed in 1837 and the property has been in private hands since that time. In 2015, the property was acquired by Rev. Michael and Dr. Tine Corrigan and the 14th Century chapel has been re-consecrated as a “Chapel Peculiar” of both the Episcopal Dioceses of Los Angeles and New York.

== See also ==
- List of Cistercian monasteries

== Bibliography ==
- Janauschek, Leopold (1877). Originum Cisterciensium - in quo, praemissis congregationum domiciliis adjectisque tabulis chronologico-genealogicis, veterum abbatiarum a monachis habitatarum fundationes ad fidem antiquissimorum fontium primus descripsit (in Latin). Vol. I. Vienna: Puthod. p. 103.
