= Santa Maria della Vittoria, Scurcola Marsicana =

Cistercian Abbey of Santa Maria della Vittoria
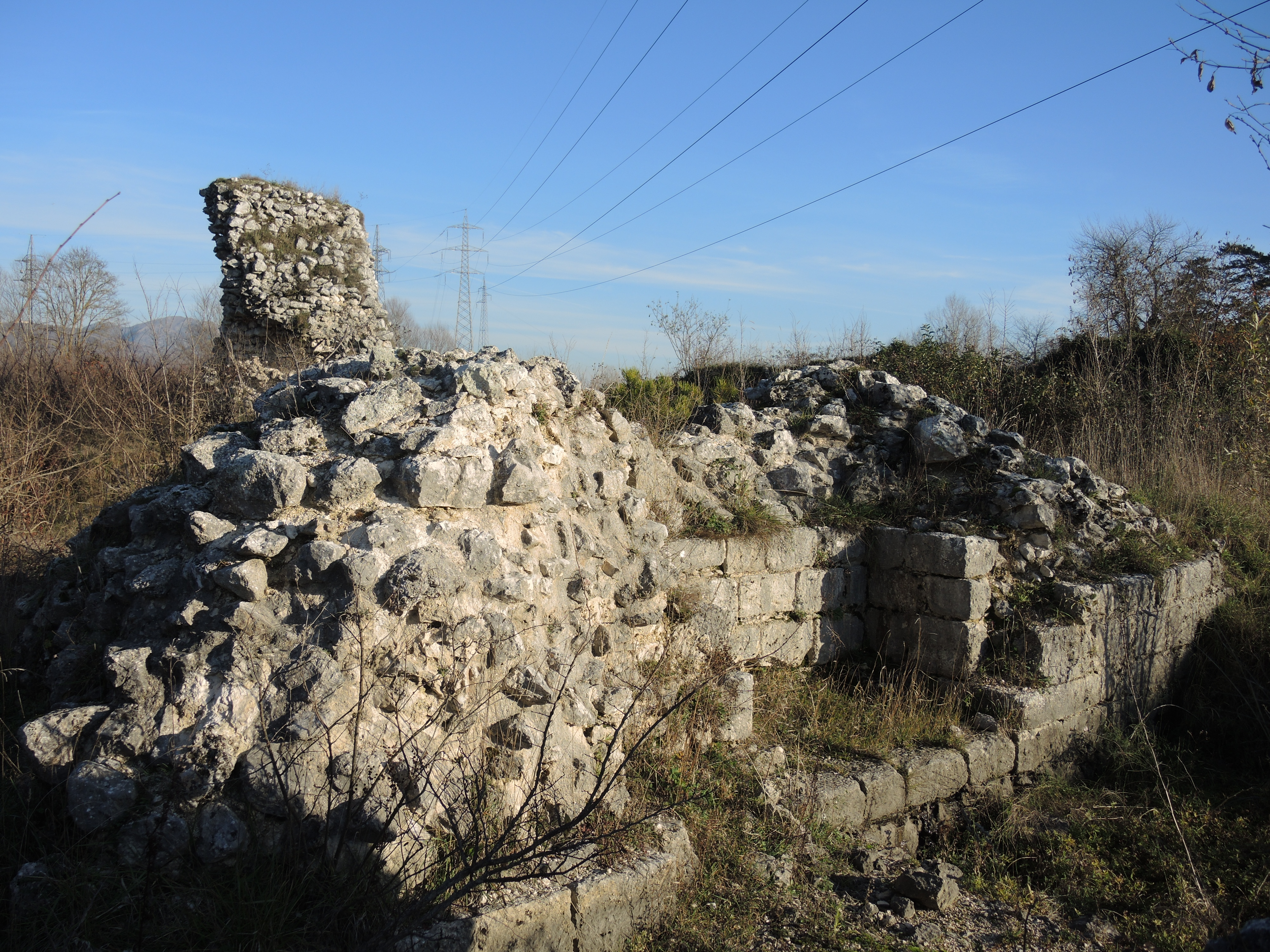

- Location within Italy
- Interactive map of Cistercian Abbey of Santa Maria della Vittoria

Monastery information
- Order: Cistercian
- Established: 1277
- Disestablished: 1550
- Mother house: Louroux Abbey
- Diocese: L'Aquila

Site
- Location: Scurcola Marsicana, Italy
- Coordinates: 42.072498°N 13.357124°E
- Public access: yes

The Abbey of Santa Maria della Vittoria (Italian: L’abbazia di Santa Maria della Vittoria) was a Cistercian monastery located in Scurcola Marsicana, Province of L'Aquila, Italy.

== History ==
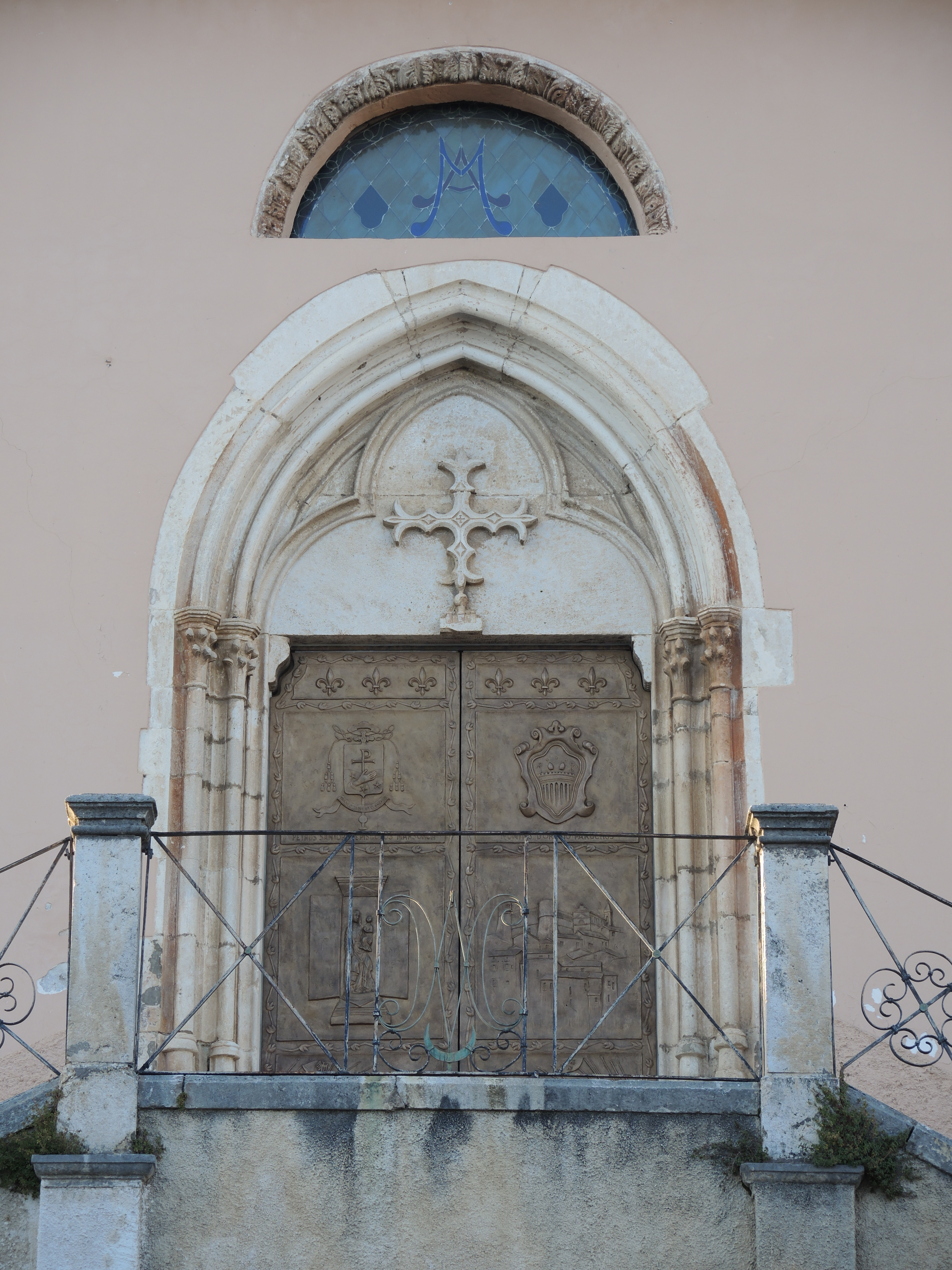
Portal of the old abbey in the new church of Santa Maria della Vittoria

The abbey was built by Charles I of Naples (Carlo d'Anjou) to celebrate the victory in the Battle of Tagliacozzo against the Hohenstaufen Duke of Swabia Conradin, to control the Kingdom of Sicily.

The construction started in 1274, and in 1277 the abbey hosted the first monks, recruited only from the French mother Abbey of Louroux in Vernantes (Anjou), places of origin of large part of the soldiers involved in the battle.

The church was consecrated on May 12, 1278 and it was definitively completed in 1282. Over more than a century the abbey thrived, but the fortunes fell with the extinction of the line of Anjou from the rule of Sicily (and Naples) that distinctly occurred in 1442 with the ascension of Alfonso V of Aragon to the that kingship. The Cistercian monks were soon replaced by Italian Benedictines. The monastic complex was heavily damaged by an earthquake in 1502, and abandoned in 1550. Fragments of the ruins were utilized in the construction of the present church and other buildings.

== Architecture ==
Nowadays the abbey is completely destroyed. Two portals of the original church can be found in different churches of Scurcola Marsicana: the new church of Santa Maria della Vittoria, close to the Rocca Orsini, and the Sant’Antonio church, along the Via Tiburtina.

== See also ==
- List of Cistercian monasteries

== Bibliography ==
- Mammarella, Luigi (1995). "Santa Maria della Vittoria di Scurcola". Abbazie e monasteri cistercensi in Abruzzo (in Italian). Cerchio (AQ): Adelmo Polla Editore. p. 115-138. ISBN 8874070276.
