= Bellebranche Abbey =

Abbey in Mayenne, France

Coordinates: 47.8794°N 0.4403°W

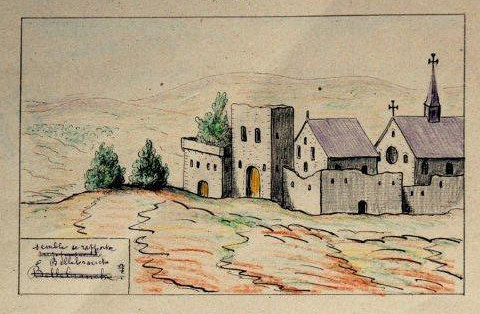
Anonymous 17th-century drawing of the abbey

Bellebranche Abbey (French: Abbaye de Bellebranche) is a former Cistercian monastery located in Saint-Brice, Mayenne, France, founded in 1152 and suppressed during the French Revolution.

== History ==
Bellebranche Abbey was established by monks from Louroux Abbey, in Anjou, in 1150. The foundation was made final on 27 July 1152 by the gift of Robert III de Sablé. His son, Robert IV de Sablé, confirmed and augmented his father's gift on the death of his wife, Clemence of Mayenne, and his departure for the Holy Land in 1190.

The foundation was confirmed by Popes Alexander III in 1165, Urban IV in 1264, Clement IV and Boniface VIII. Among the privileges of the monks was that of electing the abbot and the prior, which they took care to have confirmed in 1498 by Louis XII.

The abbey was soon the richest of the Cistercian houses of Anjou and Maine, thanks to the generosity of the lords of Sablé, Château-Gontier, Laval, Craon, Sillé, Anthenaise and Rohan.

The abbey was suppressed and sold off as a national asset in 1793.
