= Francueil =

- Commune
- Coat of arms
- Location of Francueil
- Location within France Location within Centre-Val de Loire
- Coordinates: 47°18′46″N 1°05′01″E
- Country: France
- Region: Centre-Val de Loire
- Department: Indre-et-Loire
- Arrondissement: Loches
- Canton: Bléré

Government
  - Mayor (2020–2026): Pierre Ehlinger
- Area^{1}: 12.91 km^{2} (4.98 sq mi)
- Highest elevation: 117 m (384 ft)
- Lowest elevation: 54 m (177 ft)
- Population (2023): 1,461
  - Density: 113.2/km^{2} (293.1/sq mi)
- Time zone: UTC+01:00 (CET)
  - Summer (DST): UTC+02:00 (CEST)
- INSEE/Postal code: 37110 /37150
- ^{1} French Land Register data, which excludes lakes, ponds, glaciers > 1 km^{2} (0.386 sq mi or 247 acres) and river estuaries.

Francueil (French pronunciation: [fʁɑ̃kœj]) is a commune in the Indre-et-Loire department in central France.

== Notable residents ==
Yvette Cauchois, a leading French physicist, was born here in 1908.

== Population ==
Historical population
Year	Pop.	±% p.a.
1968	790	—
1975	704	−1.63%
1982	799	+1.82%
1990	890	+1.36%
1999	945	+0.67%
2007	1,264	+3.70%
2012	1,311	+0.73%
2017	1,377	+0.99%
2023	1,461	+0.99%
Source: INSEE

== See also ==
- Communes of the Indre-et-Loire department
