= Épeigné-les-Bois =

- Commune
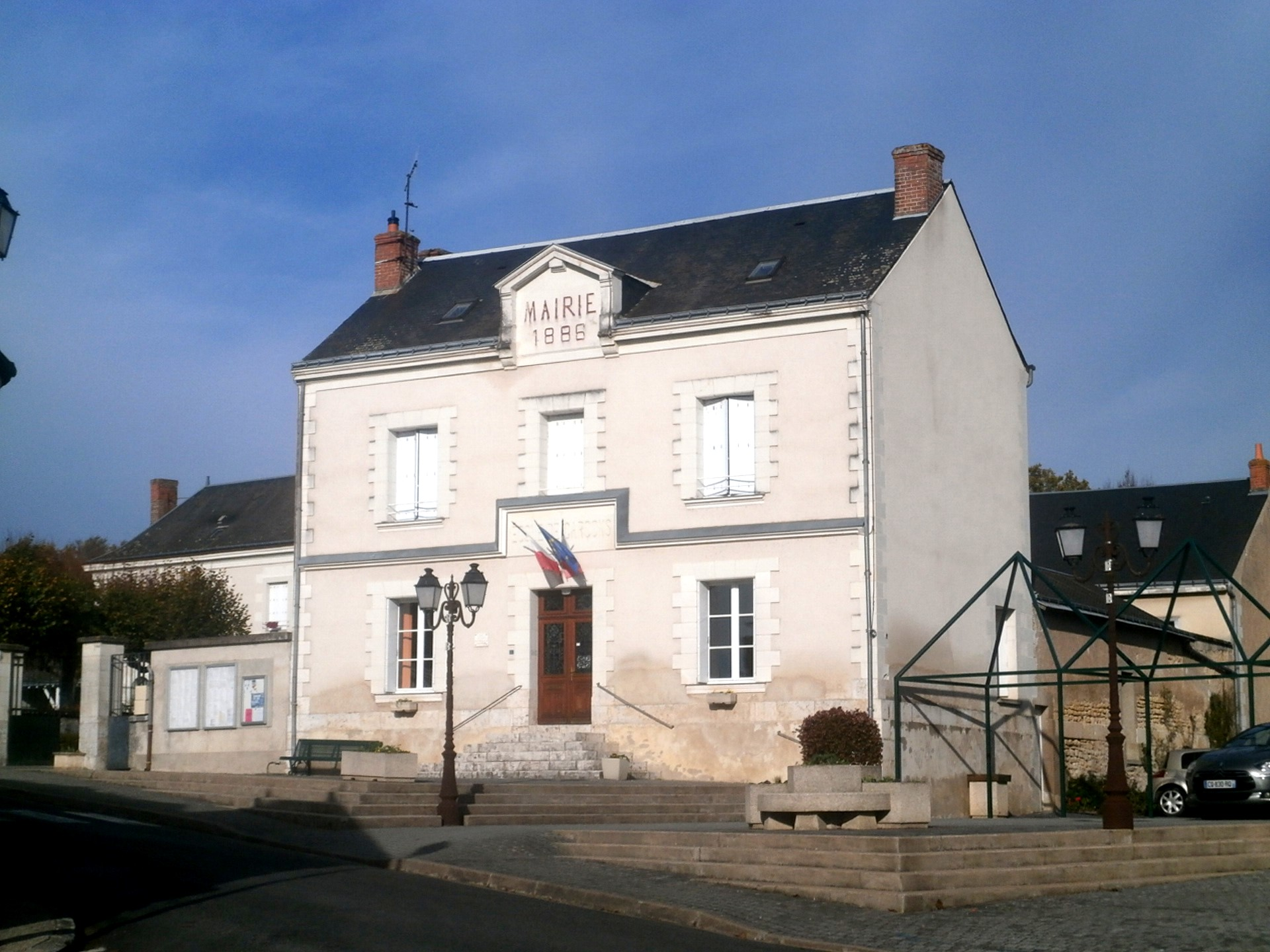
- Town hall
- Location of Épeigné-les-Bois
- Location within France Location within Centre-Val de Loire
- Coordinates: 47°16′52″N 1°06′42″E
- Country: France
- Region: Centre-Val de Loire
- Department: Indre-et-Loire
- Arrondissement: Loches
- Canton: Bléré

Government
  - Mayor (2020–2026): Jean Candiago
- Area^{1}: 14.52 km^{2} (5.61 sq mi)
- Highest elevation: 141 m (463 ft)
- Lowest elevation: 71 m (233 ft)
- Population (2023): 401
  - Density: 27.6/km^{2} (71.5/sq mi)
- Time zone: UTC+01:00 (CET)
  - Summer (DST): UTC+02:00 (CEST)
- INSEE/Postal code: 37100 /37150
- ^{1} French Land Register data, which excludes lakes, ponds, glaciers > 1 km^{2} (0.386 sq mi or 247 acres) and river estuaries.

Épeigné-les-Bois (French pronunciation: [epɛɲe le bwa]) is a commune in the Indre-et-Loire department in central France.

== Population ==
Historical population
| Year | Pop. | ±% p.a. |
|---|---|---|
| 1968 | 404 | — |
| 1975 | 351 | −1.99% |
| 1982 | 389 | +1.48% |
| 1990 | 364 | −0.83% |
| 1999 | 376 | +0.36% |
| 2007 | 417 | +1.30% |
| 2012 | 436 | +0.90% |
| 2017 | 423 | −0.60% |
| 2023 | 401 | −0.89% |
Source: INSEE

== See also ==
- Communes of the Indre-et-Loire department
