= Villeloin-Coulangé =

- Commune
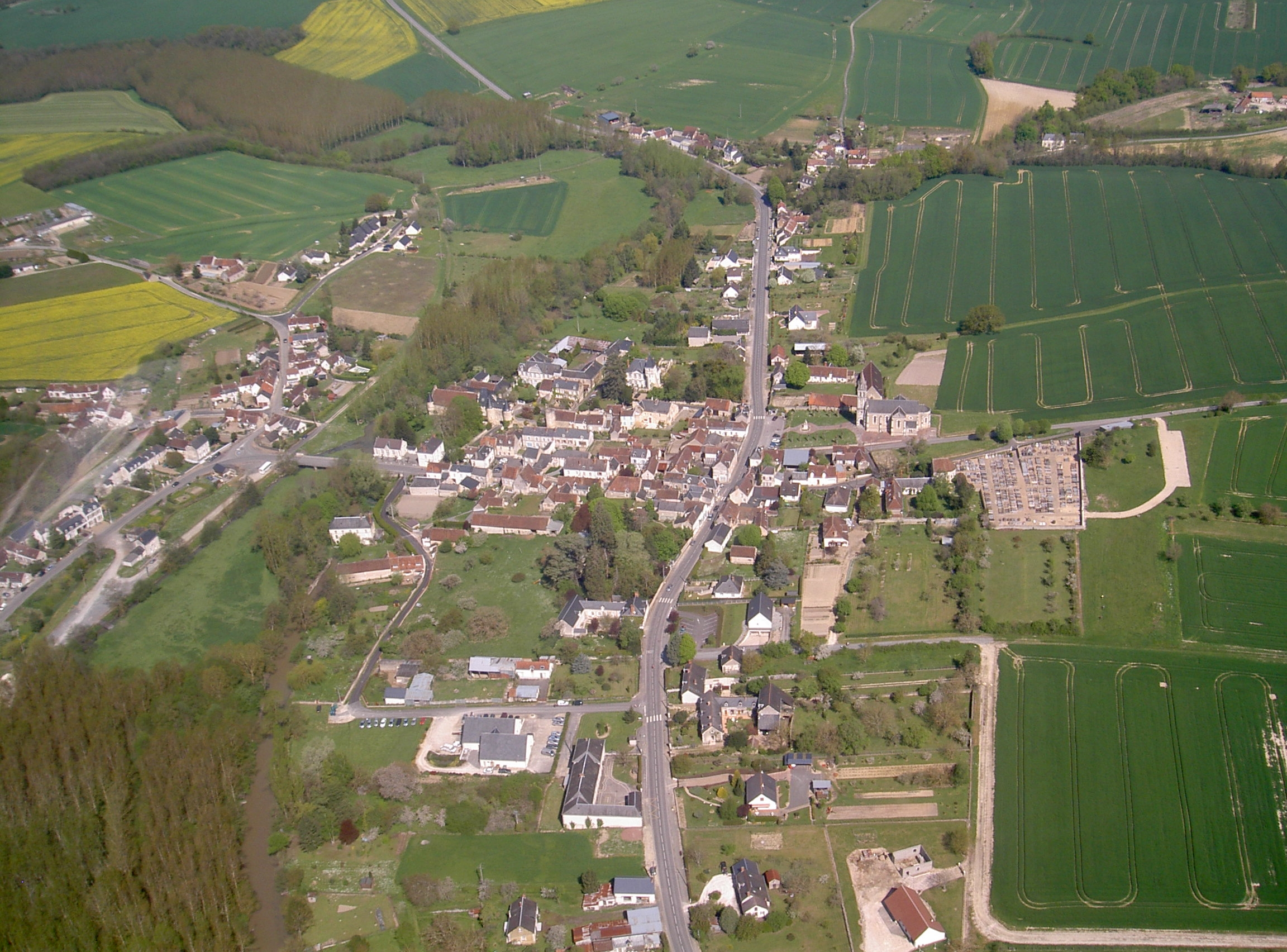
- An aerial view of Villeloin-Coulangé
- Location of Villeloin-Coulangé
- Location within France Location within Centre-Val de Loire
- Coordinates: 47°08′29″N 1°13′27″E
- Country: France
- Region: Centre-Val de Loire
- Department: Indre-et-Loire
- Arrondissement: Loches
- Canton: Loches
- Intercommunality: CC Loches Sud Touraine

Government
  - Mayor (2020–2026): Maryse Garnier
- Area^{1}: 34.62 km^{2} (13.37 sq mi)
- Highest elevation: 144 m (472 ft)
- Lowest elevation: 92 m (302 ft)
- Population (2023): 580
  - Density: 17/km^{2} (43/sq mi)
- Time zone: UTC+01:00 (CET)
  - Summer (DST): UTC+02:00 (CEST)
- INSEE/Postal code: 37277 /37460
- ^{1} French Land Register data, which excludes lakes, ponds, glaciers > 1 km^{2} (0.386 sq mi or 247 acres) and river estuaries.

Villeloin-Coulangé (French pronunciation: [vil.lwɛ̃ kulɑ̃ʒe]) is a commune in the Indre-et-Loire department in central France.

== Geography ==
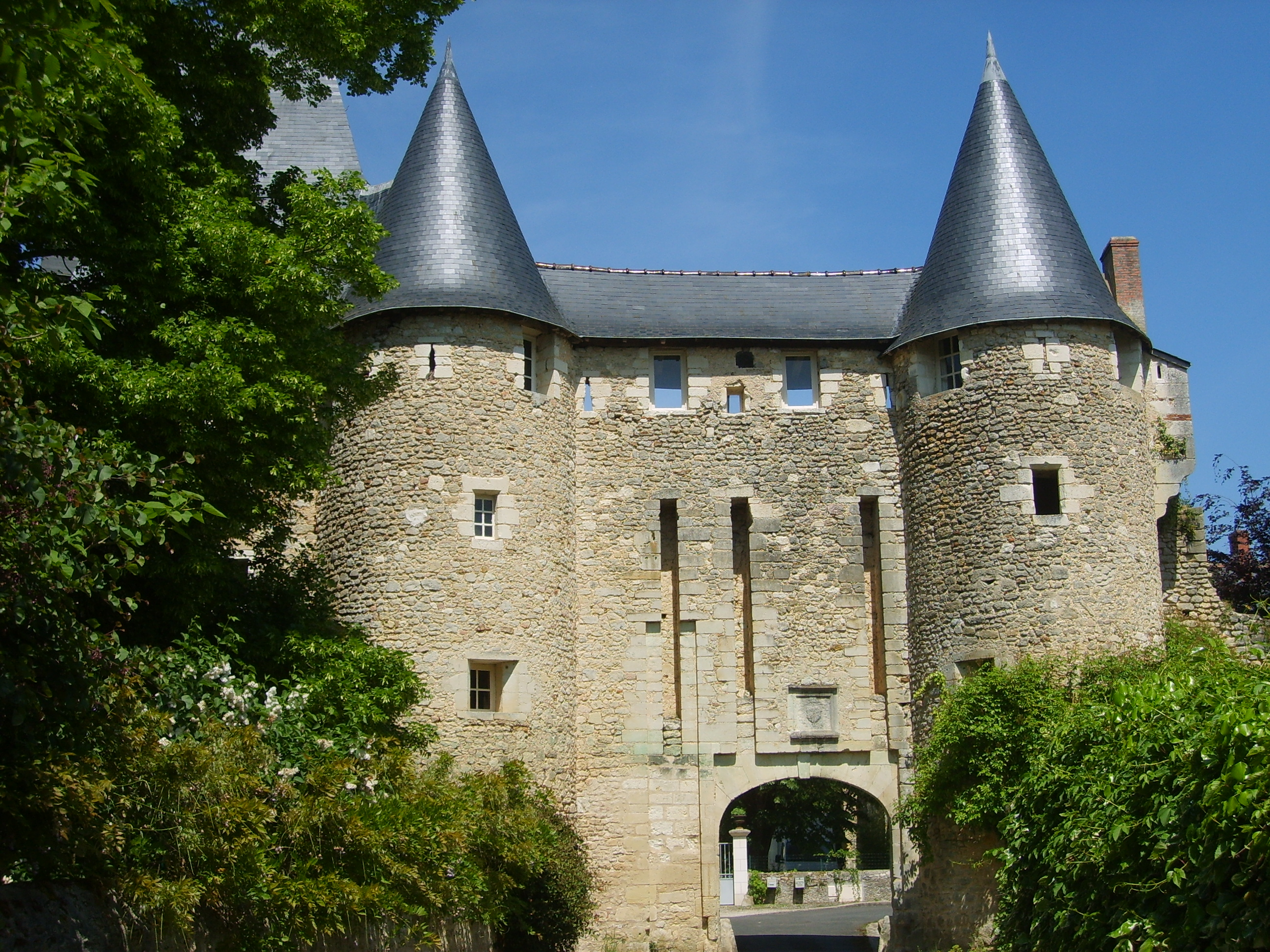
Former Saint-Sauveur abbey in Villeloin-Coulangé.

The Indrois flows northwest through the commune and crosses the village.

== Population ==
Historical population
Year	Pop.	±% p.a.
1968	830	—
1975	681	−2.79%
1982	573	−2.44%
1990	571	−0.04%
1999	618	+0.88%
2007	638	+0.40%
2012	643	+0.16%
2017	599	−1.41%
2023	580	−0.54%
Source: INSEE

== See also ==
- Communes of the Indre-et-Loire department
- Saint-Sauveur de Villeloin Abbey
