= Vernantes =

- Commune
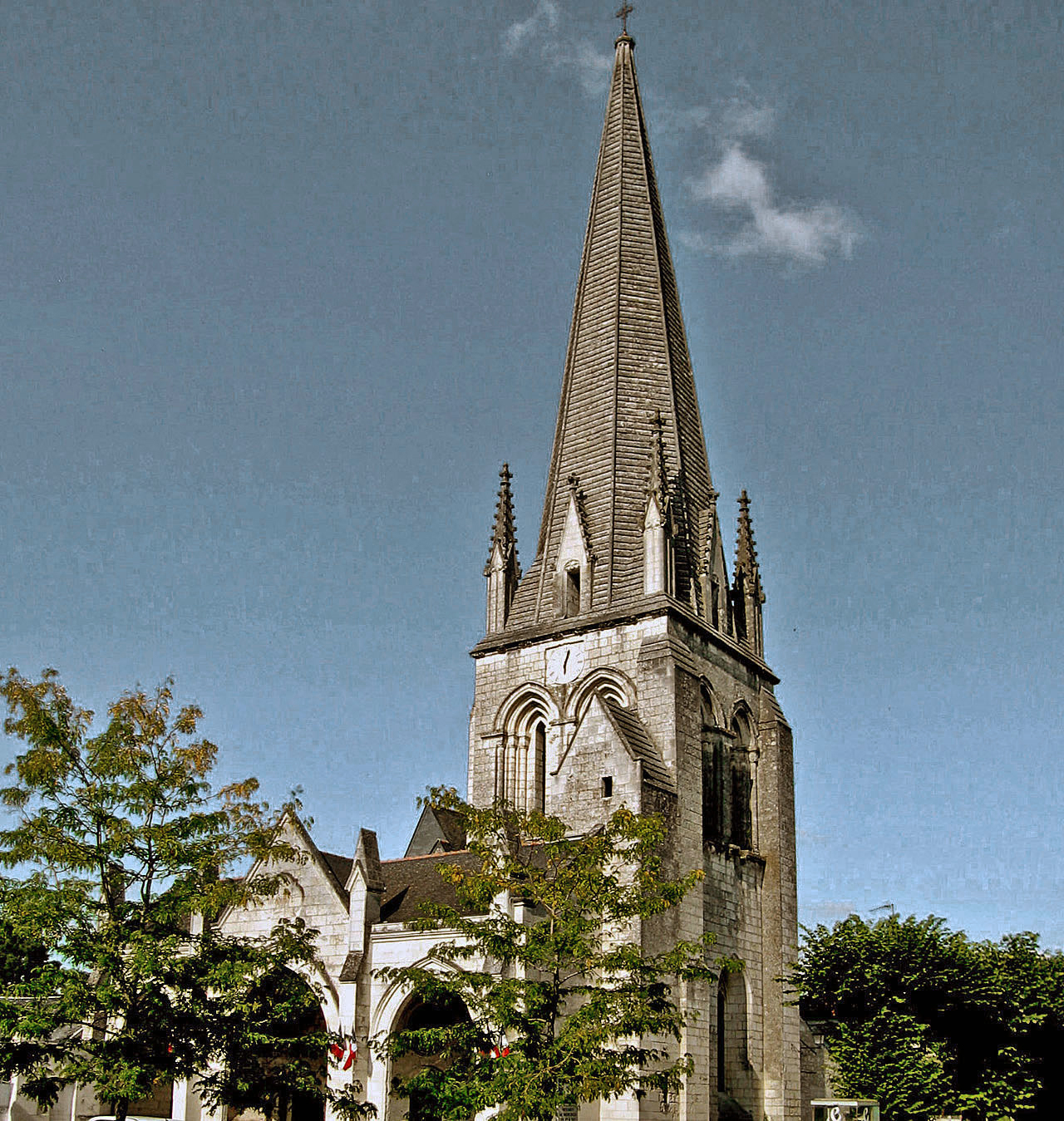
- The church of Notre-Dame

- Coat of arms
- Location of Vernantes
- Location within France Location within Pays de la Loire
- Coordinates: 47°23′38″N 0°03′10″E
- Country: France
- Region: Pays de la Loire
- Department: Maine-et-Loire
- Arrondissement: Saumur
- Canton: Longué-Jumelles
- Intercommunality: CA Saumur Val de Loire

Government
  - Mayor (2020–2026): Thierry Papot
- Area^{1}: 40.77 km^{2} (15.74 sq mi)
- Highest elevation: 111 m (364 ft)
- Lowest elevation: 33 m (108 ft)
- Population (2023): 2,004
  - Density: 49.15/km^{2} (127.3/sq mi)
- Demonym(s): Vernantais, Vernantaise
- Time zone: UTC+01:00 (CET)
  - Summer (DST): UTC+02:00 (CEST)
- INSEE/Postal code: 49368 /49390
- ^{1} French Land Register data, which excludes lakes, ponds, glaciers > 1 km^{2} (0.386 sq mi or 247 acres) and river estuaries.

Vernantes (French pronunciation: [vɛʁnɑ̃t]) is a commune in the Maine-et-Loire department in western France.

== Population ==
Historical population
Year	Pop.	±% p.a.
1968	1,808	—
1975	1,715	−0.75%
1982	1,696	−0.16%
1990	1,749	+0.39%
1999	1,852	+0.64%
2007	1,876	+0.16%
2012	1,980	+1.08%
2017	1,997	+0.17%
2023	2,004	+0.06%
Source: INSEE

== See also ==
- Communes of the Maine-et-Loire department
