= Nouans-les-Fontaines =

- Commune
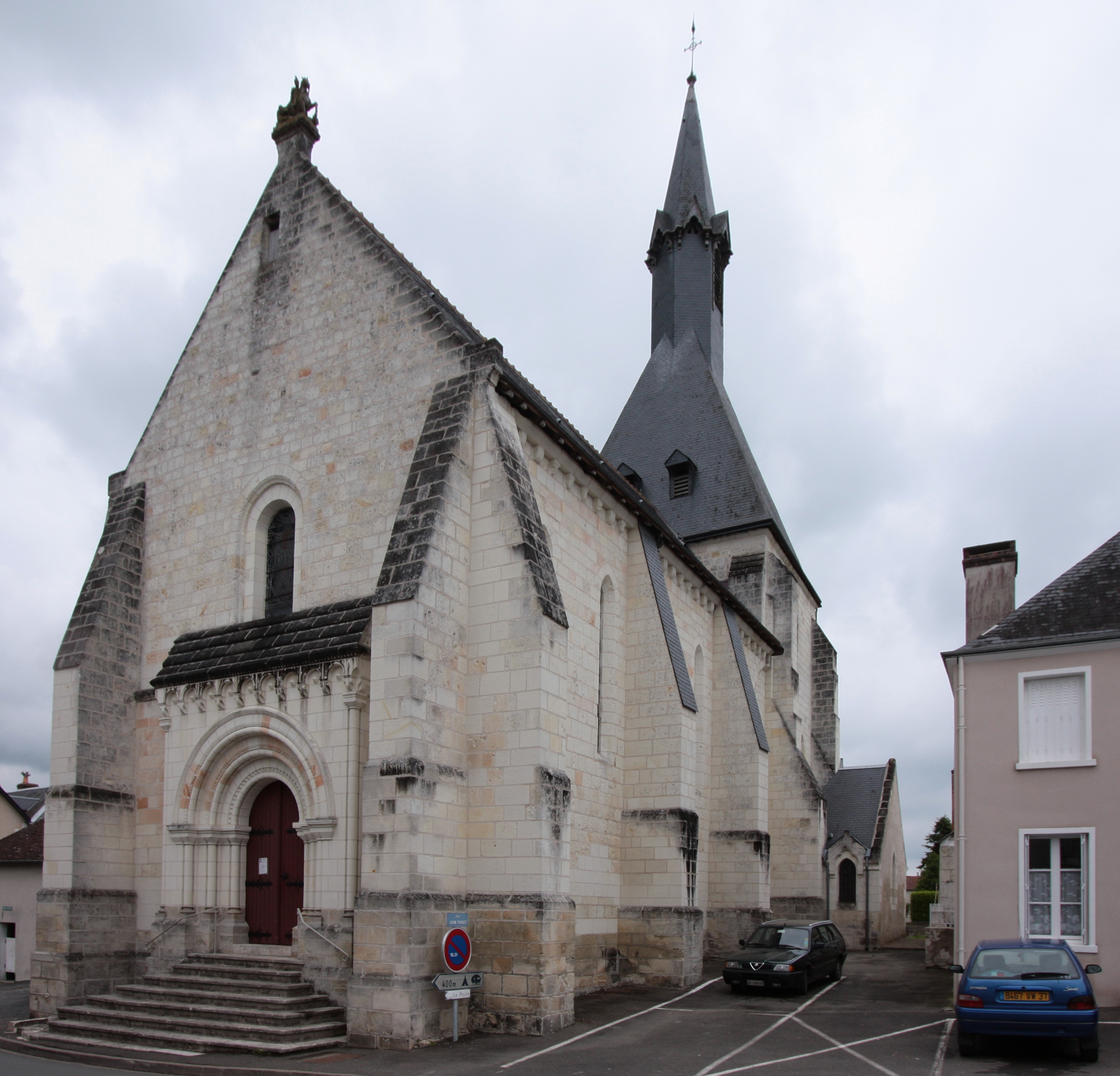
- The church of Saint-Martin, in Nouans-les-Fontaines

- Coat of arms
- Location of Nouans-les-Fontaines
- Location within France Location within Centre-Val de Loire
- Coordinates: 47°08′13″N 1°17′57″E
- Country: France
- Region: Centre-Val de Loire
- Department: Indre-et-Loire
- Arrondissement: Loches
- Canton: Loches
- Intercommunality: CC Loches Sud Touraine

Government
  - Mayor (2020–2026): Eric Moreau
- Area^{1}: 63.31 km^{2} (24.44 sq mi)
- Highest elevation: 162 m (531 ft)
- Lowest elevation: 101 m (331 ft)
- Population (2023): 672
  - Density: 10.6/km^{2} (27.5/sq mi)
- Time zone: UTC+01:00 (CET)
  - Summer (DST): UTC+02:00 (CEST)
- INSEE/Postal code: 37173 /37460
- ^{1} French Land Register data, which excludes lakes, ponds, glaciers > 1 km^{2} (0.386 sq mi or 247 acres) and river estuaries.

Nouans-les-Fontaines (French pronunciation: [nwɑ̃ le fɔ̃tɛn]) is a commune in the Indre-et-Loire department in central France.

== Population ==
Historical population
Year	Pop.	±% p.a.
1968	1,015	—
1975	872	−2.15%
1982	879	+0.11%
1990	828	−0.74%
1999	789	−0.53%
2007	789	+0.00%
2012	791	+0.05%
2017	750	−1.06%
2023	672	−1.81%
Source: INSEE

== See also ==
- Communes of the Indre-et-Loire department
