= Loché-sur-Indrois =

- Commune
- Coat of arms
- Location of Loché-sur-Indrois
- Location within France Location within Centre-Val de Loire
- Coordinates: 47°05′32″N 1°13′05″E
- Country: France
- Region: Centre-Val de Loire
- Department: Indre-et-Loire
- Arrondissement: Loches
- Canton: Loches
- Intercommunality: CC Loches Sud Touraine

Government
  - Mayor (2020–2026): Nils Jensch
- Area^{1}: 74.13 km^{2} (28.62 sq mi)
- Highest elevation: 152 m (499 ft)
- Lowest elevation: 98 m (322 ft)
- Population (2023): 482
  - Density: 6.50/km^{2} (16.8/sq mi)
- Time zone: UTC+01:00 (CET)
  - Summer (DST): UTC+02:00 (CEST)
- INSEE/Postal code: 37133 /37460
- ^{1} French Land Register data, which excludes lakes, ponds, glaciers > 1 km^{2} (0.386 sq mi or 247 acres) and river estuaries.

Loché-sur-Indrois (French pronunciation: [lɔʃe syʁ ɛ̃dʁwa], literally Loché on Indrois) is a commune in the Indre-et-Loire department in central France.

== Geography ==
The Indrois flows north through the commune and crosses the village.

== Population ==
Historical population
Year	Pop.	±% p.a.
1968	872	—
1975	721	−2.68%
1982	582	−3.01%
1990	556	−0.57%
1999	532	−0.49%
2007	514	−0.43%
2012	535	+0.80%
2017	506	−1.11%
2023	482	−0.81%
Source: INSEE

== See also ==
- Communes of the Indre-et-Loire department
