= Genillé =

- Commune
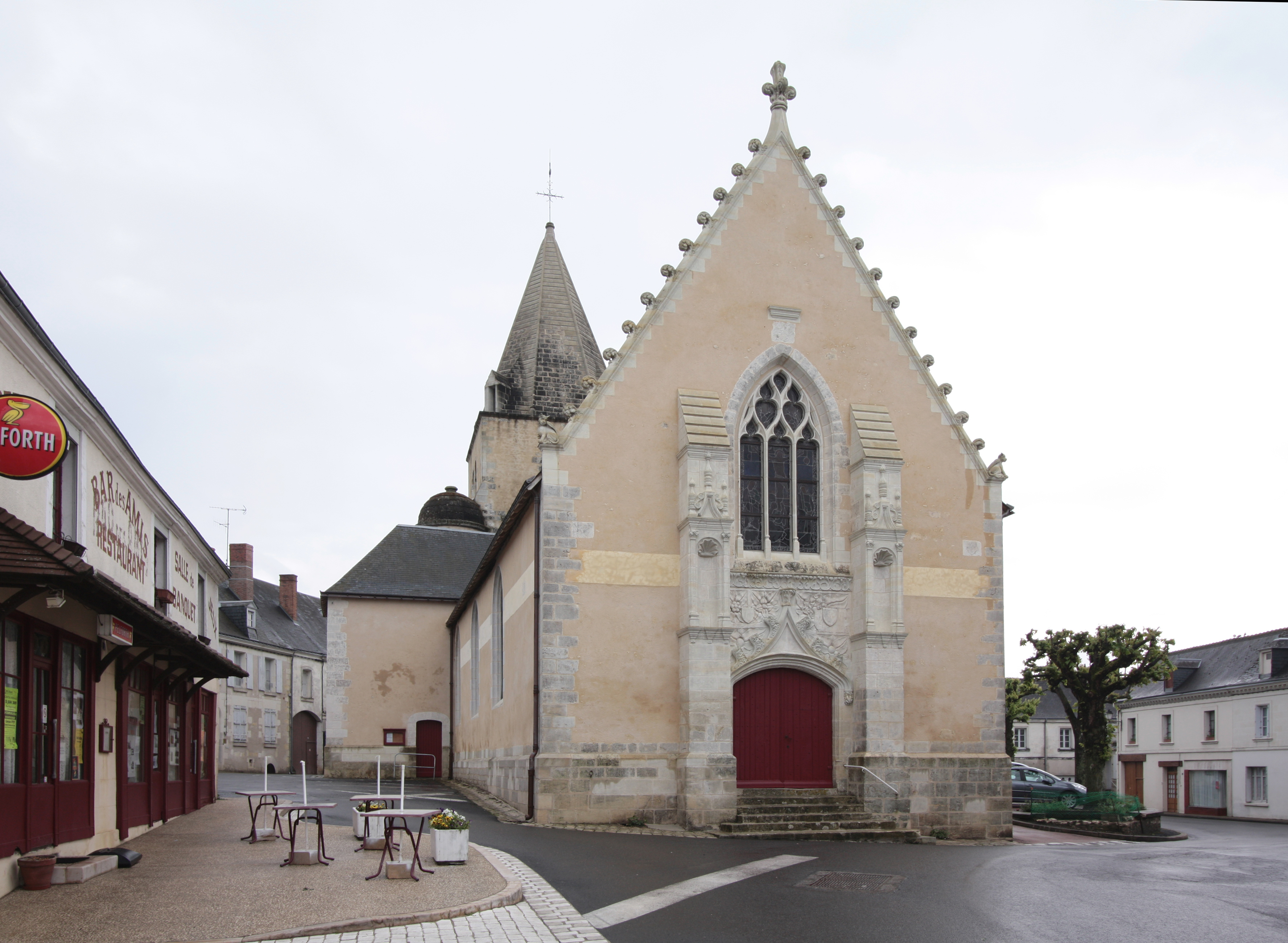
- The church of Sainte-Eulalie, in Genillé

- Coat of arms
- Location of Genillé
- Location within France Location within Centre-Val de Loire
- Coordinates: 47°11′11″N 1°05′46″E
- Country: France
- Region: Centre-Val de Loire
- Department: Indre-et-Loire
- Arrondissement: Loches
- Canton: Loches
- Intercommunality: CC Loches Sud Touraine

Government
  - Mayor (2022–2026): Olivier Flaman
- Area^{1}: 63.12 km^{2} (24.37 sq mi)
- Highest elevation: 144 m (472 ft)
- Lowest elevation: 71 m (233 ft)
- Population (2023): 1,503
  - Density: 23.81/km^{2} (61.67/sq mi)
- Time zone: UTC+01:00 (CET)
  - Summer (DST): UTC+02:00 (CEST)
- INSEE/Postal code: 37111 /37460
- ^{1} French Land Register data, which excludes lakes, ponds, glaciers > 1 km^{2} (0.386 sq mi or 247 acres) and river estuaries.

Genillé (French pronunciation: [ʒənije]) is a commune in the Indre-et-Loire department in central France.

== Geography ==
The village lies in the middle of the commune, on the right bank of the Indrois, which flows northwest through the middle of the commune and forms parts of its eastern and western borders.

== Population ==
Historical population
Year	Pop.	±% p.a.
1968	1,585	—
1975	1,417	−1.59%
1982	1,413	−0.04%
1990	1,428	+0.13%
1999	1,425	−0.02%
2007	1,506	+0.69%
2012	1,624	+1.52%
2017	1,521	−1.30%
2023	1,503	−0.20%
Source: INSEE

== See also ==
- Communes of the Indre-et-Loire department
