= Jeanne Louault =

- Born: 15 July 1912; Chédigny, France
- Died: 6 November 2011 (aged 99); Chédigny, France
- Occupation: Farmer
- Known for: Rescuing Jews during the Holocaust
- Spouse: Bernard Louault
- Awards: Righteous Among the Nations

Jeanne Louault (15 July 1912 – 6 November 2011) was a French farmer. She is on the list of the Righteous Among the Nations for having hidden Ernest and François Braunschweig on her farm.

== Biography ==
Louault was born as Jeanne Marie Édith Durand on 15 July 1912. Jeanne and her husband Bernard Louault lived a little over 4 km from the demarcation line - it passed through the town of Reignac-sur-Indre - at a place called Norçay in the town of Chédigny. They then had four children and lived with the paternal grandparents. The whole family suffered from the consequences of the successive wars: Jeanne's father died at the front on the eve of the armistice of 11 November 1918, her grandmother lived through the Franco-Prussian War and her son was mobilized. In March 1942, the couple welcomed Ernest Braunschweig and his brother François. They were 18 and 19 years old respectively and were on the run, following the Kristallnacht and the roundup of their father, sent to Dachau. Their brother was demobilized from the French Foreign Legion and worked on a farm, while the mother and the sister were hidden in the surroundings, on the edge of the woods of Reignac in the zone libre.

The couple hired the two brothers for 18 months, but they were denounced and the Gestapo came to arrest them. Francois fled by jumping out the window, and Ernest escaped from the truck during his transfer. The couple hid François for a few days and sent him to their friend, Mr. Prouteau. He joined his brother Ernest in the French Resistance, until May 1945, in the 32nd infantry regiment based in Loches. They took part in the combat on the front of the pocket of Saint-Nazaire. The two brothers then remained in close contact with the Louault family.

== Distinctions and tributes ==
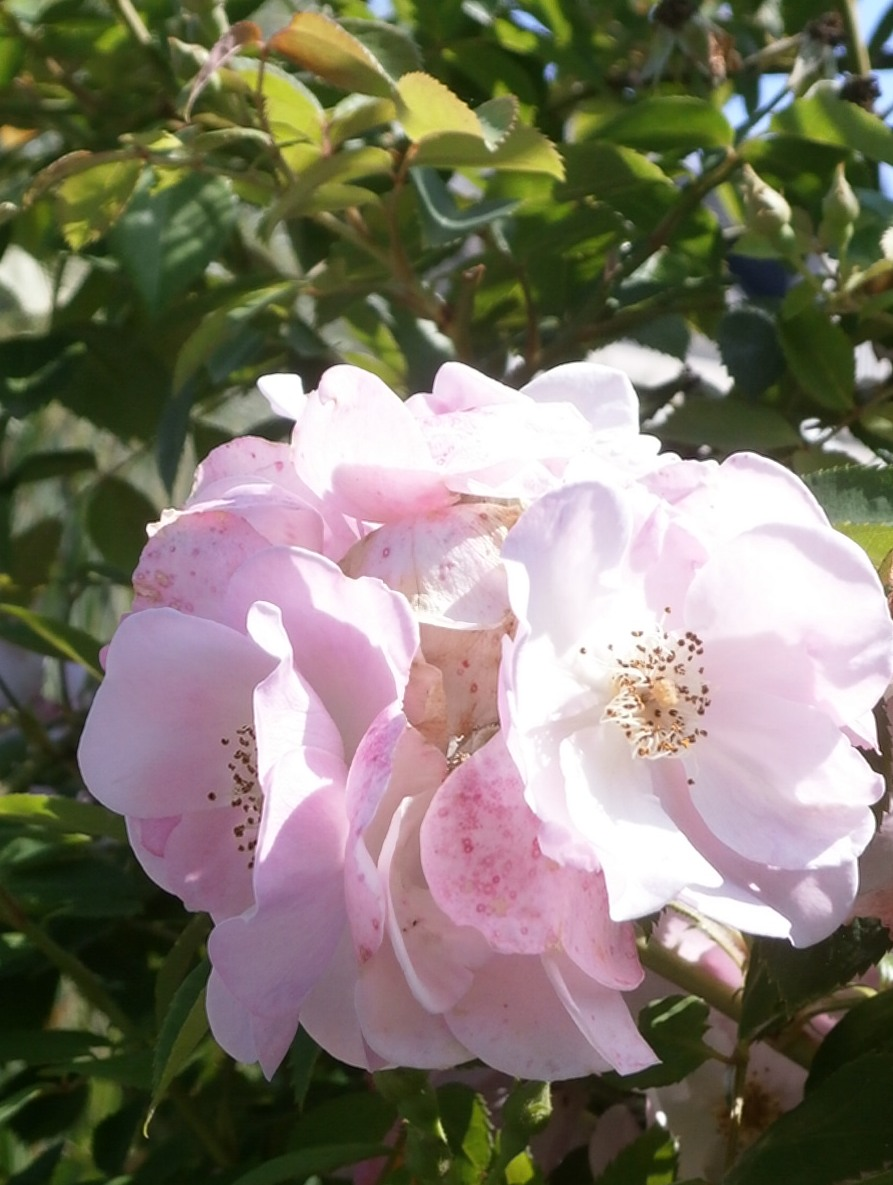
Rose 'Jeanne de Chédigny'.

Louault and her husband received the title of Righteous Among the Nations on 6 May 2002. In 2007, she was appointed to the rank of Chevalier of the Legion of Honor for her action as Just. In 2011, on the occasion of the Chédigny Rose Festival, the rose 'Jeanne de Chédigny' was named after her first name to pay tribute to her.
