= Château d'Armaillé =

Château located in Loches, near Tours in France's Loire Valley

Coordinates: 47.1291°N 1.0035°E

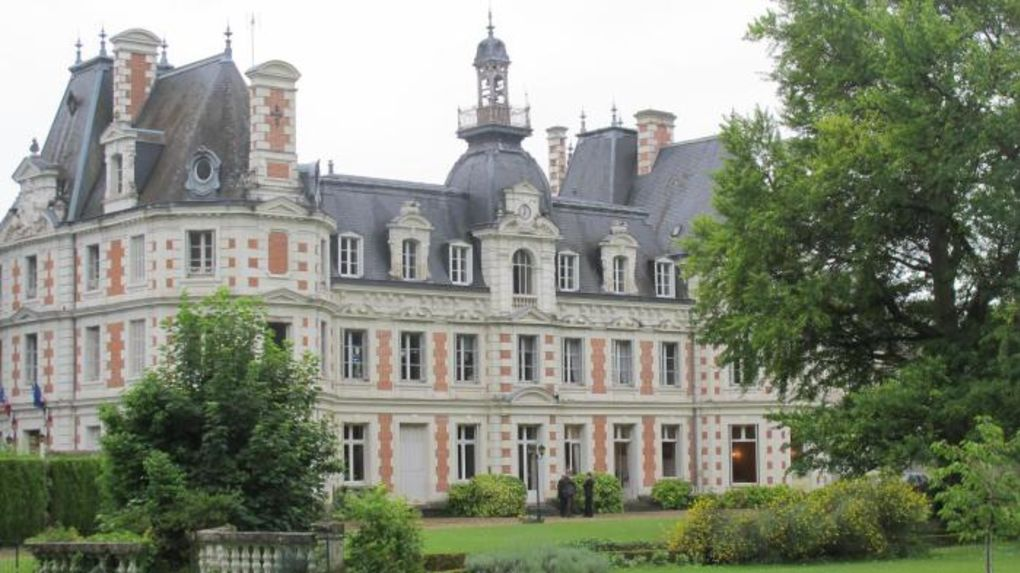
View of Château d'Armaillé

Château d'Armaillé is an aristocratic château located in Loches, near Tours in France's Loire Valley. It adopted the Napoleon III style. It was constructed between 1839 and 1864, from red brick and stone

The structure is surrounded by 7.4 acres of grounds, in English Garden style. To the East is the river Indre alongside the driveway and entrance, and the famous 'three bridges' connecting the Royal City of Loches to the Island, and to the village of Beaulieu-les-Loches on the opposite river bank. The island is surrounded by the Park of the Royal Prairies, and a wetlands reserve, a wildlife sanctuary of approximately 305 hectares of protected parkland surrounding Armaillé, where the Indre river valley separates the villages. To the West, the border is a modern hospital and the fortified Medieval village of Loches; and to the north, helipads, fields and forests.

== History ==
The Château was built for the Count Arthur de Marsay in 1859. it originally featured 9 bedrooms. It was constructed on the site of an ancient Capuchin monastery, which was transformed following the French Revolution to become an 80-room, private hunting lodge and home in the middle of the Royal Forest. Named after his daughter, Viscountess Armaillé, it remained in the family until 1947, when it was purchased by the State. The castle was extended to the west in the late 1800s, and served as the archives for the French Marine Department during World War II.

The estate was renovated in the 1970s, and then again in the 2000s, when the stables hosted the office of the Sous Préfecture, and the residence accommodated the local Sous and Sub Prefects.

In 2019, the property was sold by the local department and returned to private residential use.

== Construction ==
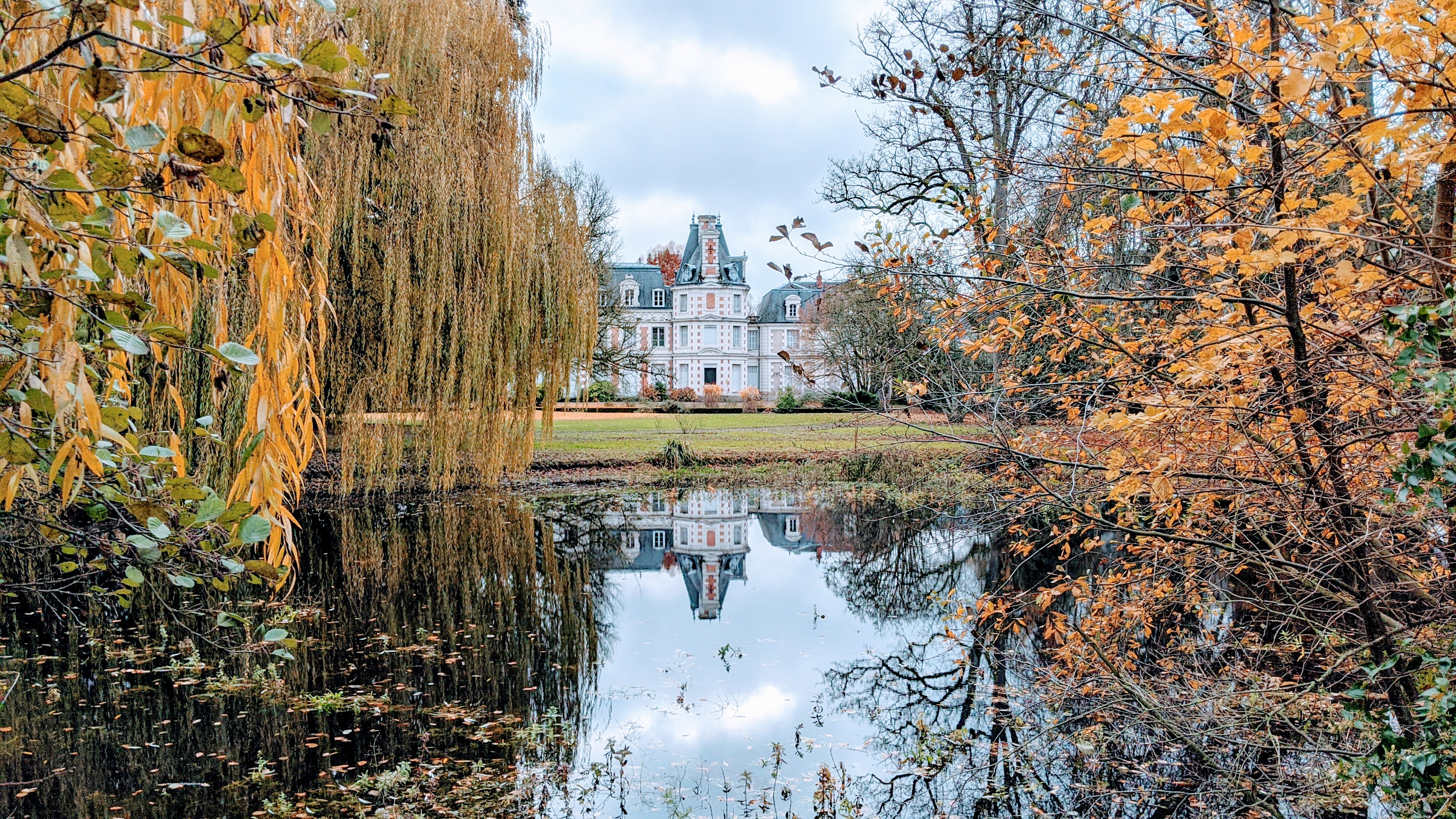
November 29th 2019; view of the main building complex, in autumn.

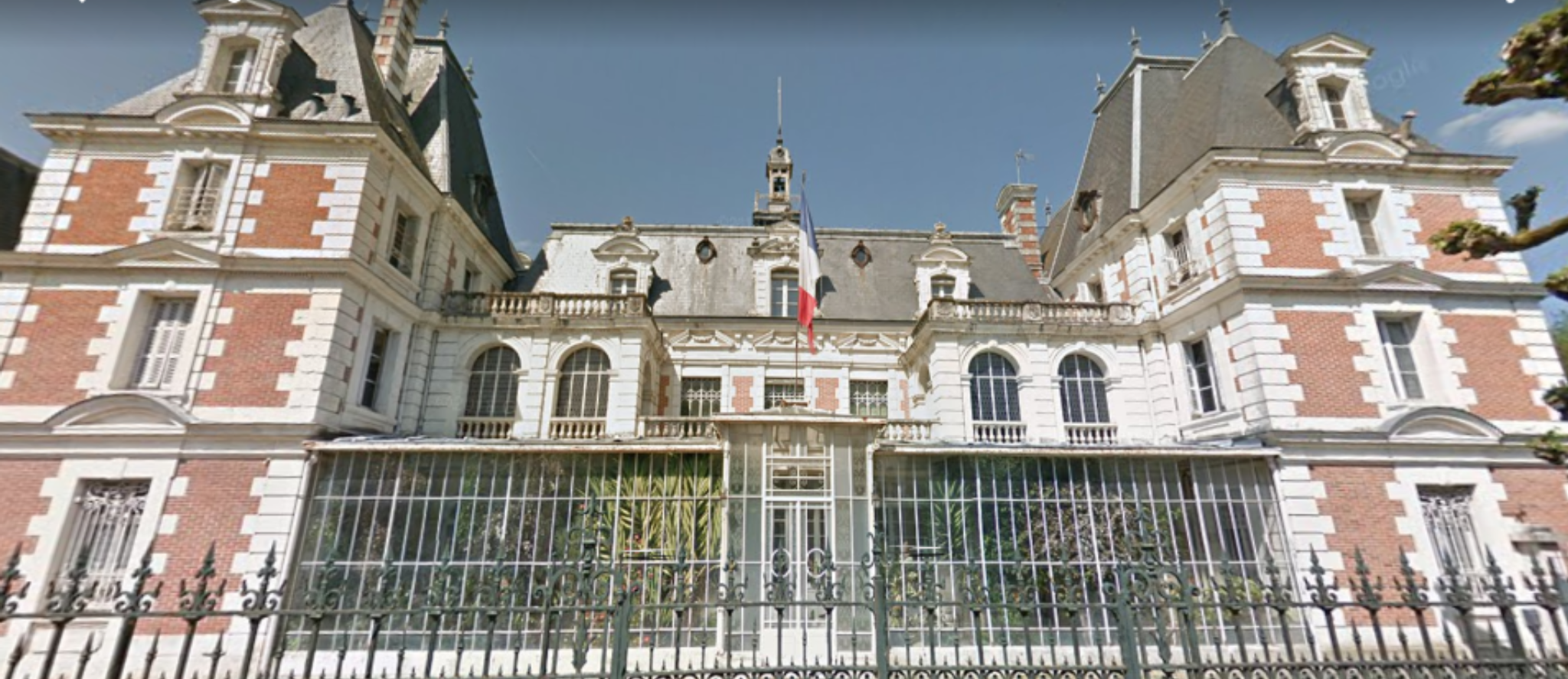
Formal entrance and public facade, on the south aspect of the Chateau d'Armaille, Loches

It was built of Tuffeau and red brick. Like numerous buildings in the Loire Valley, the walls, stables, and most of the main building use blocks of tuffeau stone interlaced with red brick, giving a modern, English appearance. Tuffeau stone is not dense, and can absorb 50% of its mass in water when wet; weighing only 20% more than water when dry. This makes it prone to decay when temperatures fall below freezing during damp, cold weather, a frequent occurrence.

Other examples of this stone's use exist, including the Château de Beaulieu near Saumur, the Château d'Ussé and the Château de la Motte d'Usseau, and many worker's cottages at Longères.

== Royal City ==
The central location of the Château d'Armaillé and its large park is relatively unique due to its proximity to the Royal City, within the township of Loches. Its role as the Head of Government Service made it an "important part of the French state". While many other Renaissance style châteaux flourished in the Loire Valley, medieval fortresses such as Royal City of Loches make these surroundings fairly unique, because of the Château d'Armaille's close proximity to the center of such a historic urban region.

Due to the character of its residence and keep, Loches is one of the most beautiful fortified cities in France, and the royal citadel dominates the surrounding skyline with Indre's bucolic valley and the medieval townships on either side.

Just a few hundred feet away from Château d'Armaillé, the royal residence is an architectural "gem of the end of the Middle Ages", and welcomed Joan of Arc, Anne of Brittany, and the favourite of King Charles VII, Agnès Sorel.

The 37-metre high fortified royal keep is an unusual feature of any Chateau in the Loire Valley, and a "masterpiece" of 11th-century military architecture and one of the most well preserved in Europe. Now a museum, its numerous painted and engraved inscriptions, the city and citadel immerse visitors in the universe of the time.

Remains of the once-ubiquitous chateaux-forts are scattered throughout the Loire Valley, but in the small town of Loches, a half-hour's drive south of Tours, the feudal past has been preserved with such remarkable integrity that it takes on the aura of a world of its own. Loches's gloomy 1,000-year-old castle keep is still intact and the medieval configuration of streets still holds, mostly forbidden to cars. The village is in fact one of the best-preserved in France, but because its attractions are of an entirely different order from its Renaissance neighbors, it is often overlooked in their favor.

Perched atop a rocky promontory, Loches rises with appropriately daunting perpendicularity above the valley of the Indre River, a gentle, somewhat dawdling tributary of the Loire. In medieval times, as now, the citadel's sheer walls and bristling turrets could be seen from a great distance. Once the town was almost entirely surrounded by the Loches forest, a royal hunting preserve, but now the forest has shrunk to less than 2 miles wide by 9 miles long, and in its place is a gently rural countryside where fields give way occasionally to small clusters of houses and a parish church.

Loches was one of the strongholds from which the formidable Count of Anjou, Fulk Nerra, set out about the year 1000 to seize possession of the territory of Touraine. To anchor his conquests, he began construction of a series of Norman towers, including the keep at Loches, which was completed by his son, Geoffrey Martel.

Fulk Nerra's descendant, Henry Plantagenet, inherited the English throne in 1154 and became one of the most powerful sovereigns in Europe. Faced with the task of defending his possessions, he strengthened the fortifications at Loches. Despite this, the castle was besieged, captured and recaptured no less than four times in the next few decades, until finally it was secured for the French throne.

A plaque in the floor of the hall recalls the castle's greatest historical moment: it was here that, fresh from her astonishing victory at Orleans, in the first days of June 1429, Joan of Arc came to persuade Charles VII to go to Rheims to be crowned, an event that led eventually to the final expulsion of the English from France. The end of the Hundred Years War ultimately opened the way for the Renaissance in France.

~New York Times - 08/18/1991: "The Stone Fortress of Loches"

== Modern use ==
According to French newspaper La Nouvelle Republic, Armaillé returned to private ownership in 2019. The change of ownership resulted in the property reverting to usage as a 5 bedroom hunting lodge, as it was when purchased by the state in 1947.

The property retains a large lake, five registered outbuildings to accommodate staff and guests, and six bridges and canal crossings.

Between 2019 and 2025, some department staff were expected to remain in the Sub Prefecture annex. However, the main building will once again serve as a private residence, this time for a French family.

The building contains more than 1,500m² of refurbished, inhabitable space, four outbuildings (1000m²) all set in a park of 3 hectares (7.4 acres).
