= Ferrière-sur-Beaulieu =

- Commune
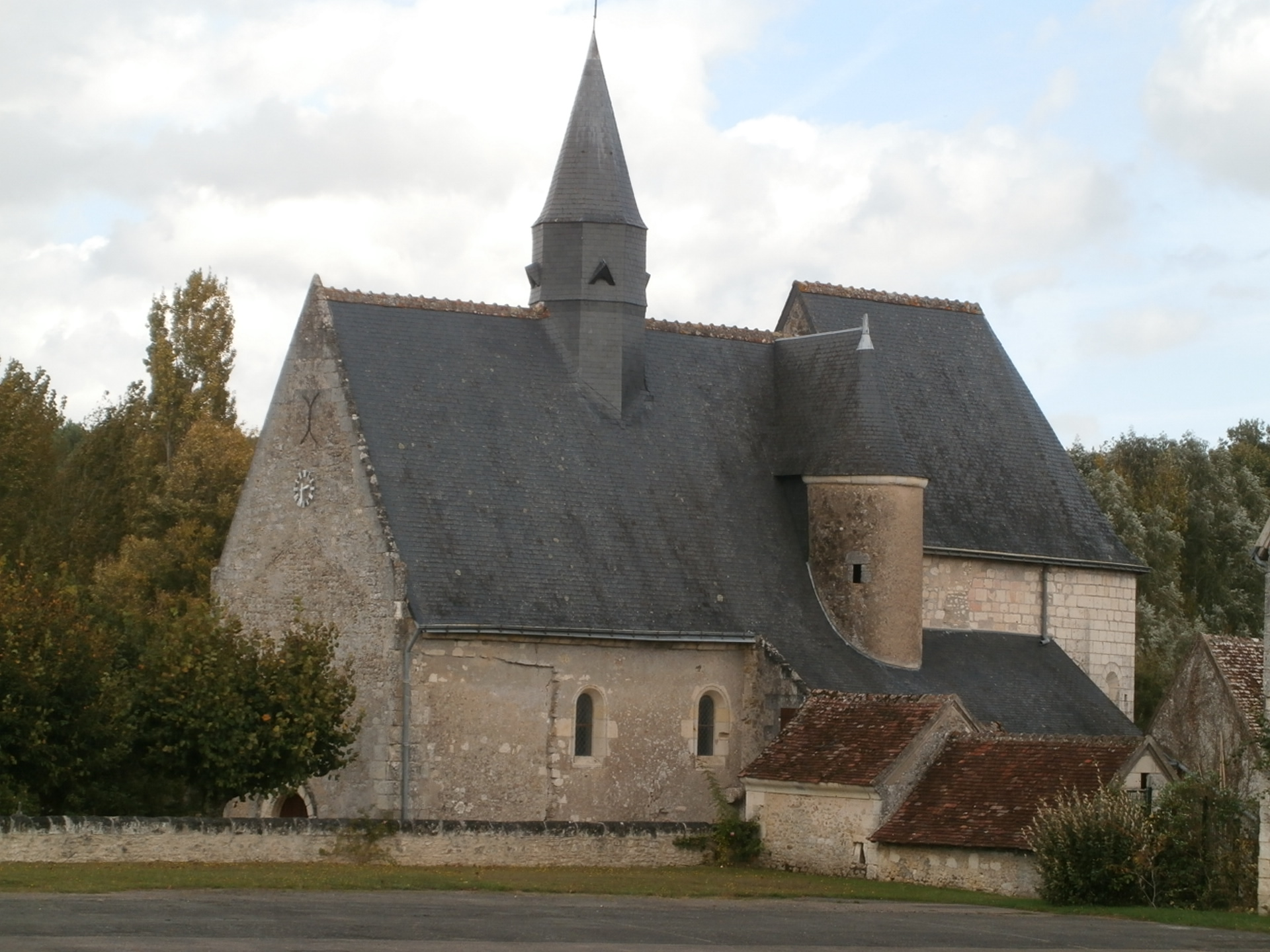
- The church of Saint-Gilles, in Ferrière-sur-Beaulieu

- Coat of arms
- Location of Ferrière-sur-Beaulieu
- Location within France Location within Centre-Val de Loire
- Coordinates: 47°08′19″N 1°02′18″E
- Country: France
- Region: Centre-Val de Loire
- Department: Indre-et-Loire
- Arrondissement: Loches
- Canton: Loches
- Intercommunality: CC Loches Sud Touraine

Government
  - Mayor (2020–2026): Gilbert Sabard
- Area^{1}: 19.63 km^{2} (7.58 sq mi)
- Highest elevation: 144 m (472 ft)
- Lowest elevation: 75 m (246 ft)
- Population (2023): 703
  - Density: 35.8/km^{2} (92.8/sq mi)
- Time zone: UTC+01:00 (CET)
  - Summer (DST): UTC+02:00 (CEST)
- INSEE/Postal code: 37108 /37600
- ^{1} French Land Register data, which excludes lakes, ponds, glaciers > 1 km^{2} (0.386 sq mi or 247 acres) and river estuaries.

Ferrière-sur-Beaulieu (French pronunciation: [fɛʁjɛʁ syʁ boljø], literally Ferrière on Beaulieu) is a commune in the Indre-et-Loire department in central France.

== Population ==
Historical population
Year	Pop.	±% p.a.
1968	239	—
1975	278	+2.18%
1982	365	+3.97%
1990	475	+3.35%
1999	563	+1.91%
2007	643	+1.67%
2012	741	+2.88%
2017	734	−0.19%
2023	703	−0.72%
Source: INSEE

== See also ==
- Communes of the Indre-et-Loire department
