= Château de La Celle-Guenand =

Castle in La Celle-Guenand, France

Coordinates: 46°56′39″N 0°53′39″E

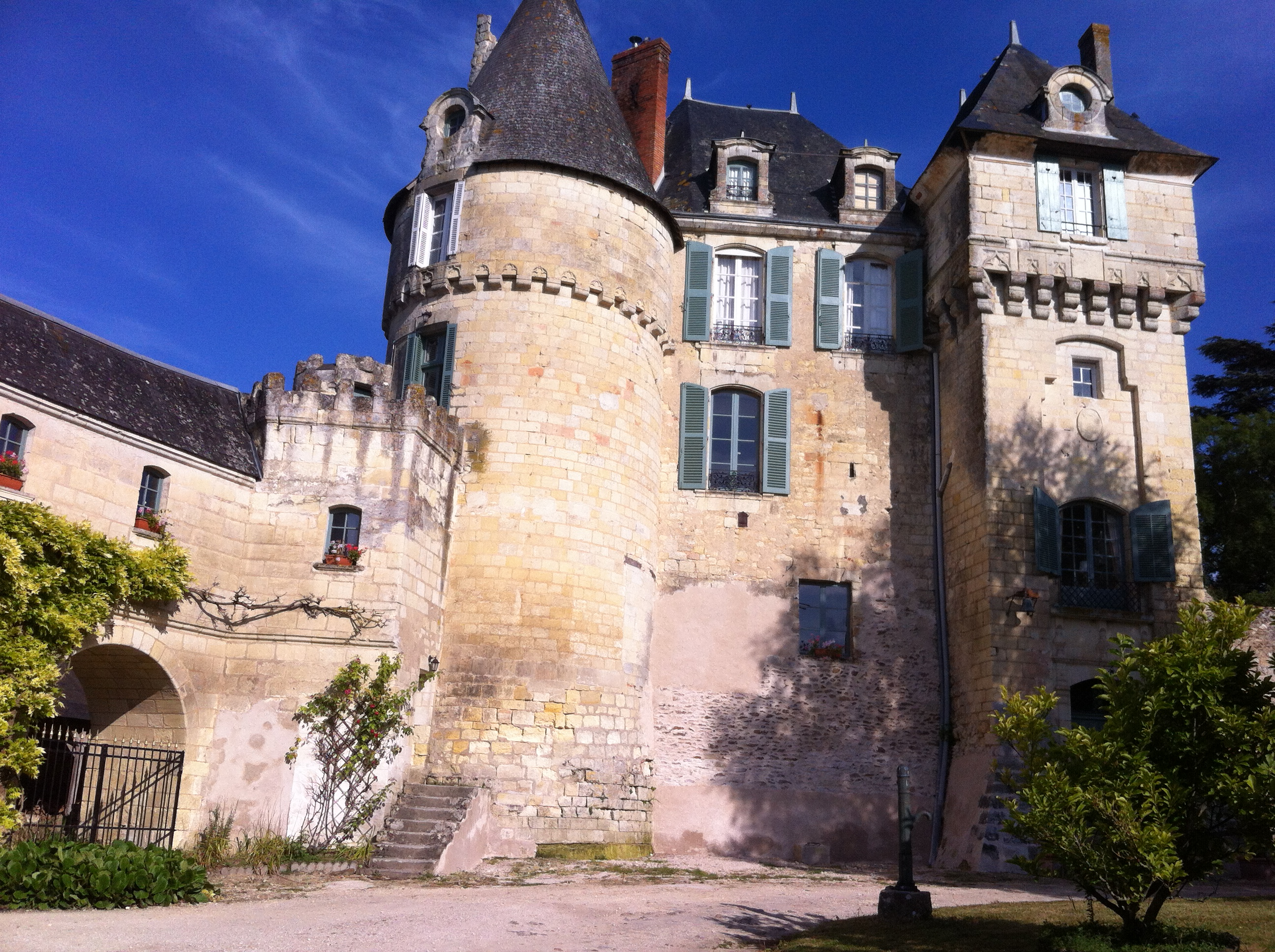
Château de La Celle-Guenand

The Château de La Celle-Guenand (French pronunciation: [ʃɑto d(ə) la sɛl ɡənɑ̃]) is a 15th-century castle in the Centre-Val de Loire region of France. Under the ancien régime this château was the seat of the Barony of La Celle-Guenand; the estate encompassed what is today the commune of La Celle-Guenand in the Indre-et-Loire department. The Château de La Celle-Guenand has been listed as a monument historique since 11 June 1943 by the Ministry of Culture.

== Snapshot ==
- Type: Medieval castle
- Built: c1422
- Ownership: Antoine de GUENAND
- Materials: Tuffeau stone
- Founded in the 10th century as a Monastery
- Reconstructed in the 15th century as a Fortress
- Restored in the 17th century as a private Residence
- Additional outbuildings built in the 19th century

== History ==
The first known Lord of this medieval château is Antoine de GUENAND, seigneur de Staint-Cyran, du Jambot, de Vitray, de Tanchou, de Brossein, and de La Celle-Geunand. His ancestry can be traced to Henry I of England (through Henrys' illegitimate daughter, Alice FitzRoy). Antoine de GUENAND is cited on April 1, 1422, for his marriage to Oralie de FONTENAY. He was appointed Captain-Governor of Loches in 1441 under Charles VII of France (who had been crowned in Reims in 1429 through the endeavors of Joan of Arc to free France from the English).

Antoine's son, Pierre de GUENAND, Lord of La Celle-Guenand inherited the estate in 1487; he was Governor of the Royal Castle at Amboise (Château d'Amboise), and Grand Chamberlain of France during the reign of Charles VIII of France. Antoine II de GUENAND, chevalier continued in his father's noble footsteps. The estate passed to Georges de GUENAND who was childless. At his death in 1556, the estate was inherited by his Aunt, Antoinette d'AZAY (née de Guenand).

In 1537, during the reign of Francis I of France, Guillaume de COUTANCE, Lord of La Celle-Guenand married Rene d'AZAY, bringing together two chatelaines; La Celle-Guenand and La Celle-Draon. The estate was held by the COUTANCE family until 1780. Religious conflict in 1779 had led to the removal of the pastor of La Celle-Guenand and the two parishes were merged, to be known as La Celle-Guenand.

Jean Cantineau de Commacres lorded over the castle of La Celle-Guenand until 1785 the last years of the French monarchy. Followed by Pierre Gaullier to midway through the French Revolution until 1794 (Louis XVI who was beheaded by guillotine in January 1793). The Revolution ended in 1799 and the estate went on to be held by the Gaullier des Bordes through the July Revolution of 1830, the First French Empire and Second French Empire until 1935, when it passed to Jacques Devaulx de Chambord.

== Today ==
The Chateau de la Celle-Guenand remains privately owned and is operated as a bed and breakfast.

== See also ==
- List of castles in France
