= Dolus-le-Sec =

- Commune
- Location of Dolus-le-Sec
- Location within France Location within Centre-Val de Loire
- Coordinates: 47°09′56″N 0°53′36″E
- Country: France
- Region: Centre-Val de Loire
- Department: Indre-et-Loire
- Arrondissement: Loches
- Canton: Loches
- Intercommunality: CC Loches Sud Touraine

Government
  - Mayor (2020–2026): Régis Girard
- Area^{1}: 27.27 km^{2} (10.53 sq mi)
- Highest elevation: 127 m (417 ft)
- Lowest elevation: 89 m (292 ft)
- Population (2023): 651
  - Density: 23.9/km^{2} (61.8/sq mi)
- Time zone: UTC+01:00 (CET)
  - Summer (DST): UTC+02:00 (CEST)
- INSEE/Postal code: 37097 /37310
- ^{1} French Land Register data, which excludes lakes, ponds, glaciers > 1 km^{2} (0.386 sq mi or 247 acres) and river estuaries.

Dolus-le-Sec (French pronunciation: [dɔly lə sɛk]) is a commune in the Indre-et-Loire department in central France.

== Population ==
Historical population
Year	Pop.	±% p.a.
1968	562	—
1975	481	−2.20%
1982	437	−1.36%
1990	507	+1.87%
1999	538	+0.66%
2007	637	+2.13%
2012	675	+1.17%
2017	671	−0.12%
2023	651	−0.50%
Source: INSEE

== See also ==
- Communes of the Indre-et-Loire department
