= Musée Josèphe Jacquiot =

Museum in France

- Established: September 24, 1993
- Location: Montgeron, France
- Coordinates: 48°42′22″N 2°27′23″E
- Type: Archaeology, art and local history
- Collections: Medals, Egyptology, Impressionist art
- Founder: Josèphe Jacquiot

Musée Josèphe Jacquiot, also Musée Municipal Josèphe Jacquiot, is a museum in Montgeron, France. The museum is named after the numismatist Josèphe Jacquiot and its collections include archives of Egyptian archaeology created by her cousin Etienne Drioton.

== Background ==
Founded by Josèphe Jacquiot, the museum was subsequently named in her honour, after her death in 1995. The museum is housed in a mansion house, Maison Chalon, in Montgeron and has four core collections: local history, medals, prints and Egyptology. The museum also has a friends association. Archives related to Maison Chalon are held in Essonne Archives. The museum formally opened on 24 September 1993.

== Collections ==
Egyptian artefacts were bequeathed to the museum by Etienne Drioton, who was a French Egyptologist, archaeologist, and Catholic canon. He moved to Montgeron to live with his cousin, Josèphe Jacquiot. One of the most significant objects is the Mefkat stele, which was purchased at auction. The Drioton collection also includes jewellery, objects, and sarcophagi. It also includes an archive of over 500 photographs from the site of Tod, south of Luxor. Personal objects related to Drioton's life are also preserved there, including his scholarly robes and pipe collection.

== Exhibitions ==
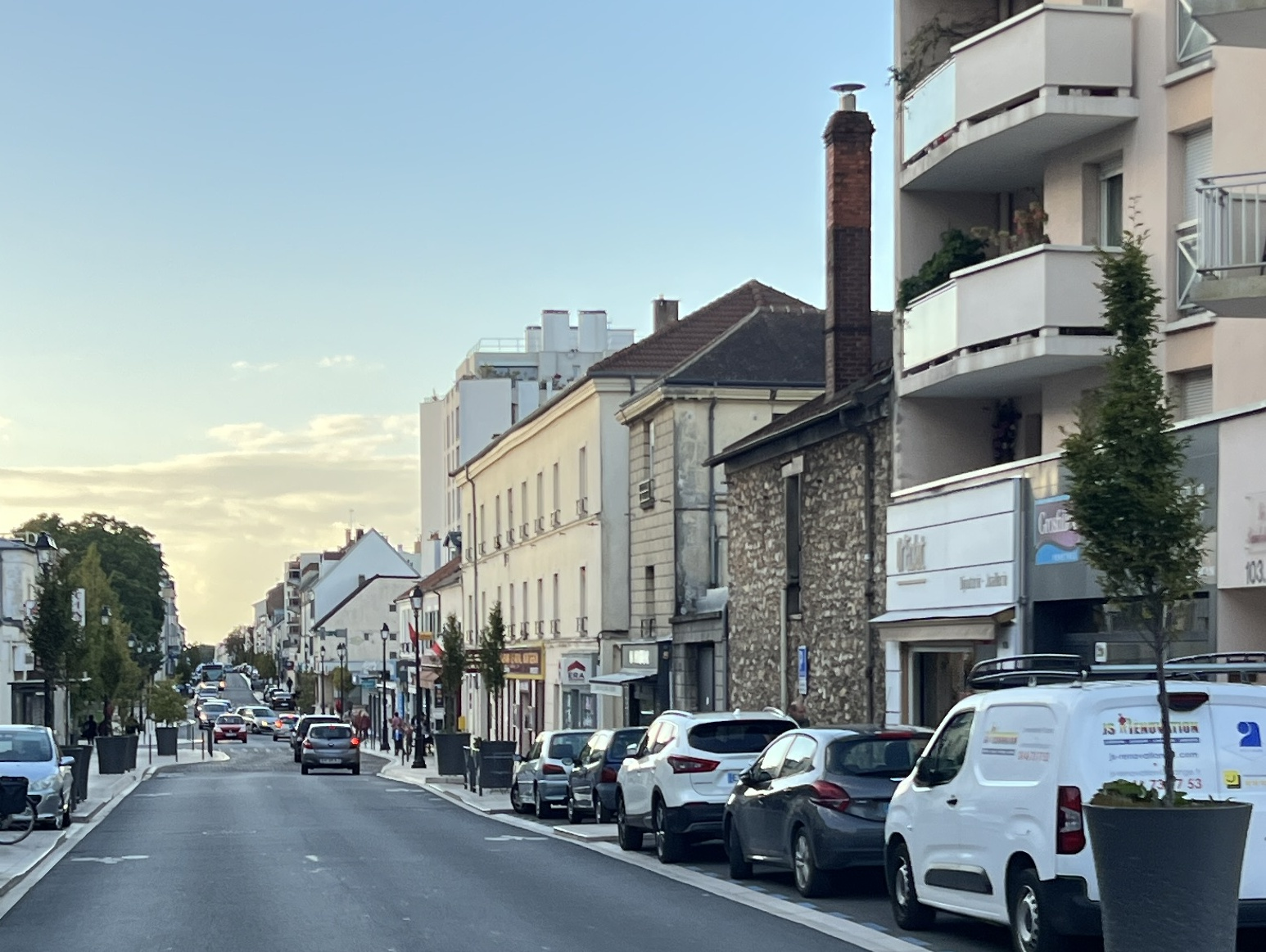
Street view of the museum

The four core collections are each exhibited in specific rooms. Local history of Montgeron is exhibited in the Gilbert Versluys Room. Egyptian collections are exhibited in the Paul Marcel Dammann and the André Jacquemin rooms. Relatedly, the Etienne Drioton Room presents the story of the life of that Egyptologist. His cousin, the founder of the museum, Josèphe Jacquiot, also has a room named for her which displays the museum's medallic and print collections.

== Curators ==
- Josèphe Jacquiot (1993–1995)
- Michèle Juret
