= Loches =

- Subprefecture and commune
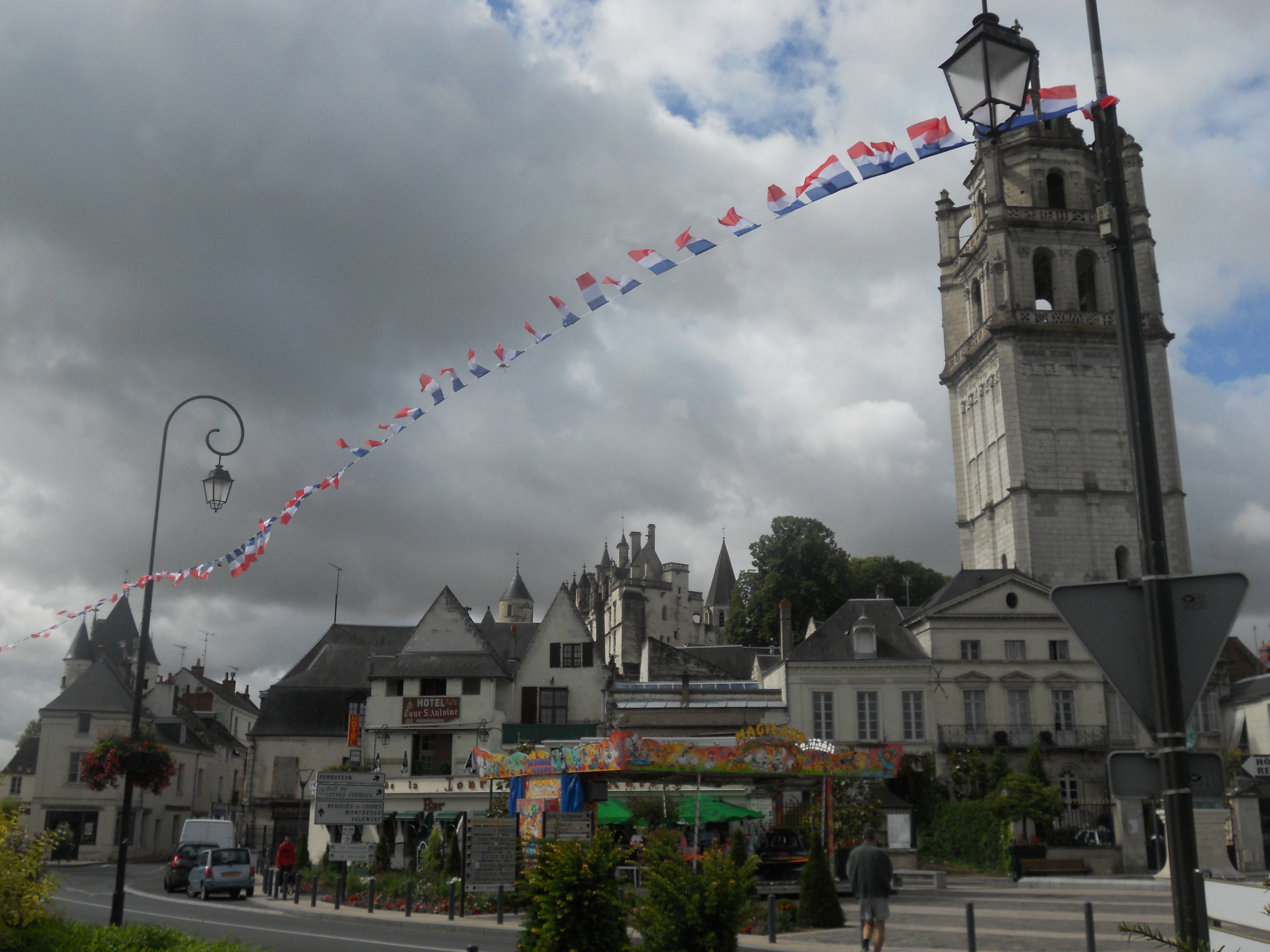
- St. Antoine Tower with the Château de Loches in the background

- Coat of arms
- Location of Loches
- Location within France Location within Centre-Val de Loire
- Coordinates: 47°07′45″N 0°59′46″E
- Country: France
- Region: Centre-Val de Loire
- Department: Indre-et-Loire
- Arrondissement: Loches
- Canton: Loches
- Intercommunality: CC Loches Sud Touraine

Government
  - Mayor (2020–2026): Marc Angenault
- Area^{1}: 27.06 km^{2} (10.45 sq mi)
- Highest elevation: 147 m (482 ft)
- Lowest elevation: 64 m (210 ft)
- Population (2023): 6,234
  - Density: 230.4/km^{2} (596.7/sq mi)
- Time zone: UTC+01:00 (CET)
  - Summer (DST): UTC+02:00 (CEST)
- INSEE/Postal code: 37132 /37600
- ^{1} French Land Register data, which excludes lakes, ponds, glaciers > 1 km^{2} (0.386 sq mi or 247 acres) and river estuaries.

Loches (French pronunciation: [lɔʃ]; /loʊʃ/) is a commune in the department of Indre-et-Loire, Centre-Val de Loire, France.

It is situated 42 kilometres (26 mi) southeast of Tours by road, on the left bank of the river Indre.

== History ==
Loches (the Roman Leucae) grew up around a monastery founded about 500 by St. Ours and belonged to the Counts of Anjou from 886 until 1205. In the latter year it was seized from King John of England by Philip Augustus, and from the middle of the 13th century until after the time of Charles IX of France the castle was a residence of the kings of France, apart for a brief interlude in 1424 when it was heritably granted to Archibald Douglas, Duke of Touraine. Antoine Guenand, Lord of La Celle-Guenand was appointed Captain-Governor of Loches in 1441.

In late April of 1793 during the French Revolution at a time when the Montagnards were gaining in power, the censorship of newspapers by the Montagnard provoke a protest from the town of Loches, who complained to the Convention that 15 newspapers had been banned in the department including Girondin supporting newspapers, such as that of Gorsas and Carra.

== Population ==
Historical population

Year	Pop.	±% p.a.
1793	4,800	—
1800	4,342	−1.42%
1806	4,304	−0.15%
1821	4,558	+0.38%
1831	4,774	+0.46%
1836	4,753	−0.09%
1841	4,581	−0.73%
1846	5,058	+2.00%
1851	5,191	+0.52%
1856	5,156	−0.14%
1861	5,267	+0.43%
1866	5,154	−0.43%
1872	4,964	−0.62%
1876	5,085	+0.60%
1881	5,096	+0.04%
1886	5,141	+0.18%
1891	5,132	−0.04%
1896	5,182	+0.19%
1901	5,161	−0.08%

Year	Pop.	±% p.a.
1906	5,115	−0.18%
1911	5,346	+0.89%
1921	4,652	−1.38%
1926	4,754	+0.43%
1931	4,761	+0.03%
1936	4,944	+0.76%
1946	5,515	+1.10%
1954	5,525	+0.02%
1962	5,902	+0.83%
1968	6,359	+1.25%
1975	6,738	+0.83%
1982	6,772	+0.07%
1990	6,544	−0.43%
1999	6,328	−0.37%
2007	6,486	+0.31%
2012	6,400	−0.27%
2017	6,277	−0.39%
2023	6,234	−0.11%

Source: EHESS and INSEE (1968-2023)

== Sights ==
The town, one of the most picturesque in central France, lies at the foot of the rocky eminence on which stands the Château de Loches, the castle of the Anjou family, surrounded by an outer wall 4 m (13 ft) thick, and consisting of the old collegiate church of St Ours, the royal lodge and the donjon or keep.

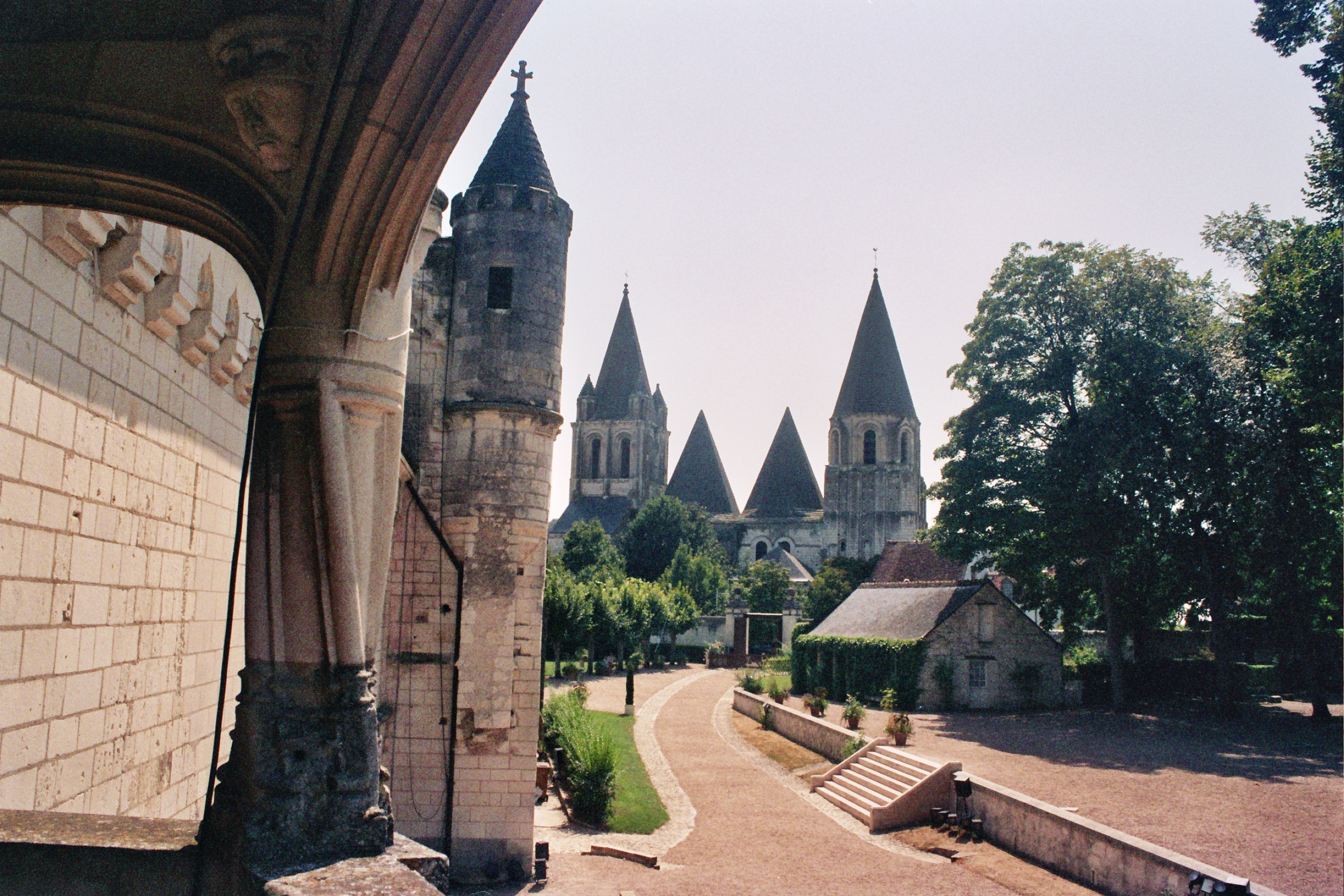
The church of St Ours from the royal lodge

The church of St Ours dates from the tenth century to the twelfth century; among its distinguishing features are the huge stone pyramids surmounting the nave and the beautiful carving of the west door. It contains the tomb of Agnès Sorel.

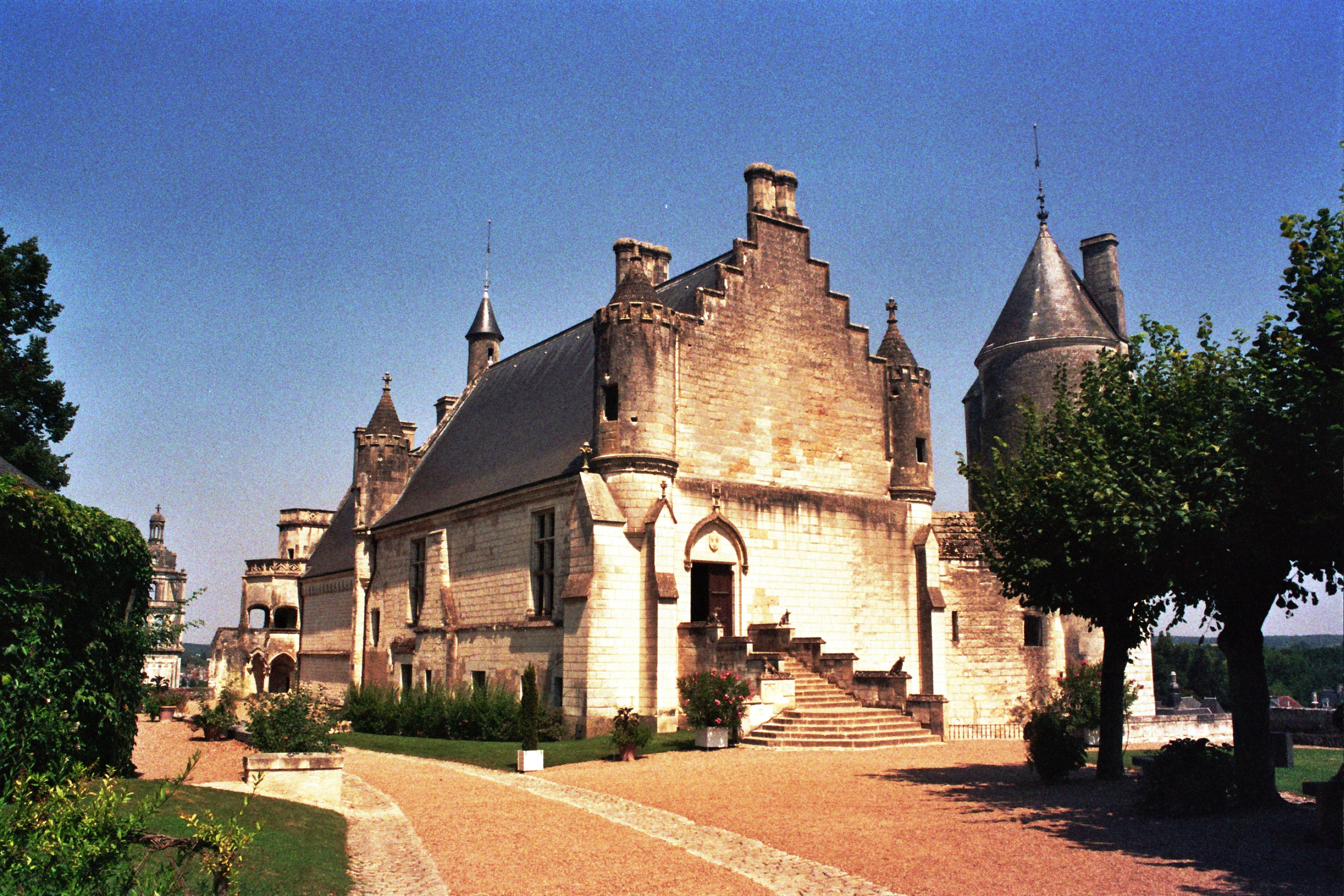
The royal lodge

The royal lodge, built by Charles VII of France and once used as the subprefecture, contains the oratory of Anne of Brittany. It was here on 11 May 1429 that Joan of Arc arrived, fresh from her historic victory at Orleans, to meet the king.

The donjon includes, besides the ruined keep (12th century), the Martelet, celebrated as the prison of Lodovico Sforza, Duke of Milan, who died there in 1508, and the Tour Ronde, built by Louis XI of France and containing the famous iron cages in which state prisoners, including according to a story now discredited, the inventor Cardinal Balue, were confined.

Loches has a town hall and several houses of the Renaissance period. The town hall was constructed after royal approval by Francis 1st in 1515.

On the right bank of the Indre, opposite the town, is the village of Beaulieu-lès-Loches, once the seat of a barony.

== Notable people ==
Loches was the birthplace of:

- Fulk III, Count of Anjou (970–1040), one of the first great builders of medieval castles.
- Nicolas Barthélemy de Loches (1478–after 1537), Benedictine monk
- Alfred de Vigny (1797–1863), poet, playwright, and novelist.
- Pierre Nicolas Gerdy (1797–1856), French physician, surgeon, anatomist, pathologist and physiologist,
- Ernest Christophe (1827–1892), sculptor, François Rude's student and a friend of Baudelaire
- Josèphe Jacquiot (1910-1995), numismatist and politician
- Jacques Villeret (1951–2005), actor.

== International relations ==
Loches is twinned with:

- Wermelskirchen, Germany
- (United Kingdom) St Andrews, Fife, Scotland
- Suzdal, Russia

== See also ==
- Château d'Armaillé
- Communes of the Indre-et-Loire department
- Louroux Priory
