= Verneuil-sur-Indre =

- Commune
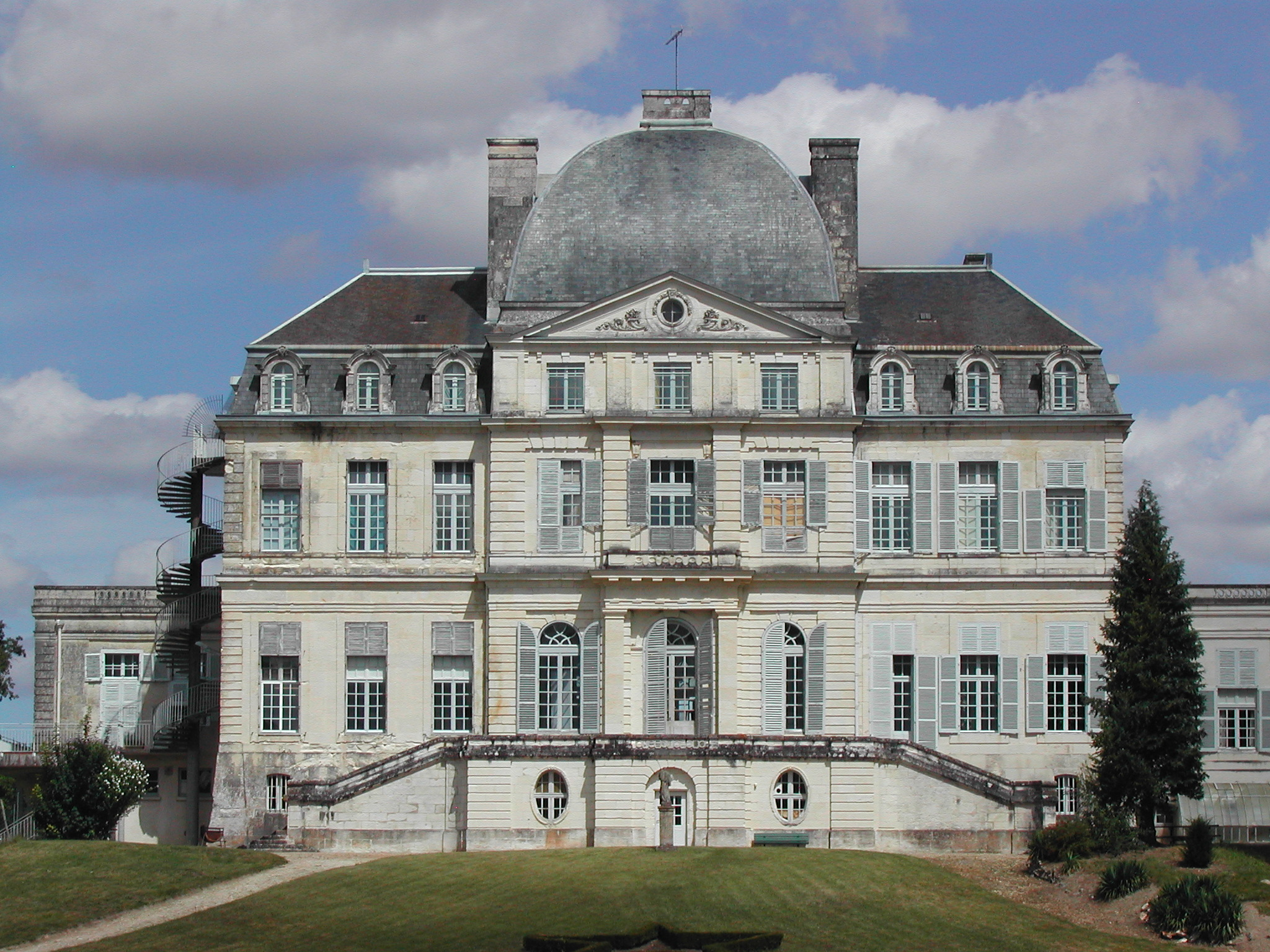
- The Château of Verneuil-sur-Indre
- Location of Verneuil-sur-Indre
- Location within France Location within Centre-Val de Loire
- Coordinates: 47°03′25″N 1°02′34″E
- Country: France
- Region: Centre-Val de Loire
- Department: Indre-et-Loire
- Arrondissement: Loches
- Canton: Loches
- Intercommunality: CC Loches Sud Touraine

Government
  - Mayor (2020–2026): Gérard Marquenet
- Area^{1}: 39.63 km^{2} (15.30 sq mi)
- Highest elevation: 149 m (489 ft)
- Lowest elevation: 73 m (240 ft)
- Population (2023): 466
  - Density: 11.8/km^{2} (30.5/sq mi)
- Time zone: UTC+01:00 (CET)
  - Summer (DST): UTC+02:00 (CEST)
- INSEE/Postal code: 37269 /37600
- ^{1} French Land Register data, which excludes lakes, ponds, glaciers > 1 km^{2} (0.386 sq mi or 247 acres) and river estuaries.

Verneuil-sur-Indre (French pronunciation: [vɛʁnœj syʁ ɛ̃dʁ], literally Verneuil on Indre) is a commune in the Indre-et-Loire department in central France.

== Population ==
Historical population
Year	Pop.	±% p.a.
1968	679	—
1975	576	−2.32%
1982	508	−1.78%
1990	462	−1.18%
1999	479	+0.40%
2007	504	+0.64%
2012	516	+0.47%
2017	480	−1.44%
2023	466	−0.49%
Source: INSEE

== See also ==
- Communes of the Indre-et-Loire department
