= Perrusson =

- Commune
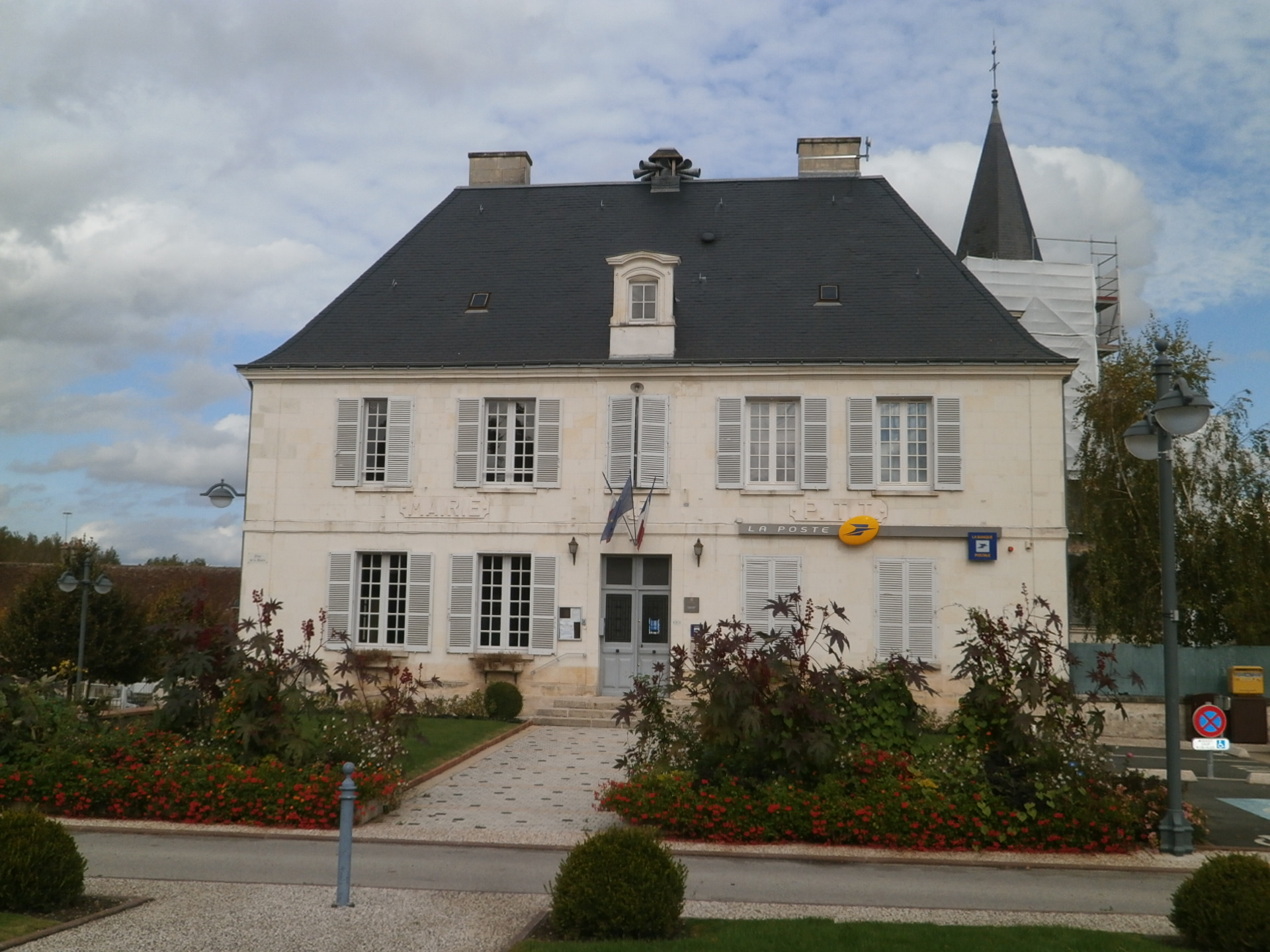
- The town hall in Perrusson
- Location of Perrusson
- Location within France Location within Centre-Val de Loire
- Coordinates: 47°06′02″N 1°00′49″E
- Country: France
- Region: Centre-Val de Loire
- Department: Indre-et-Loire
- Arrondissement: Loches
- Canton: Loches
- Intercommunality: CC Loches Sud Touraine

Government
  - Mayor (2020–2026): Bernard Gaultier
- Area^{1}: 28.94 km^{2} (11.17 sq mi)
- Highest elevation: 149 m (489 ft)
- Lowest elevation: 72 m (236 ft)
- Population (2023): 1,399
  - Density: 48.34/km^{2} (125.2/sq mi)
- Time zone: UTC+01:00 (CET)
  - Summer (DST): UTC+02:00 (CEST)
- INSEE/Postal code: 37183 /37600
- ^{1} French Land Register data, which excludes lakes, ponds, glaciers > 1 km^{2} (0.386 sq mi or 247 acres) and river estuaries.

Perrusson (French pronunciation: [pɛʁysɔ̃]) is a commune in the Indre-et-Loire department in central France.

== Population ==
Historical population
Year	Pop.	±% p.a.
1968	849	—
1975	1,057	+3.18%
1982	1,233	+2.22%
1990	1,315	+0.81%
1999	1,418	+0.84%
2007	1,512	+0.81%
2012	1,548	+0.47%
2017	1,486	−0.81%
2023	1,399	−1.00%
Source: INSEE

== Notable people ==
- Josèphe Jacquiot (1910-1995), numismatist and politician is buried there.

== See also ==
- Communes of the Indre-et-Loire department
