= Villedômain =

- Commune
- Location of Villedômain
- Location within France Location within Centre-Val de Loire
- Coordinates: 47°03′17″N 1°15′29″E
- Country: France
- Region: Centre-Val de Loire
- Department: Indre-et-Loire
- Arrondissement: Loches
- Canton: Loches
- Intercommunality: CC Loches Sud Touraine

Government
  - Mayor (2020–2026): Vincent Meunier
- Area^{1}: 16.47 km^{2} (6.36 sq mi)
- Highest elevation: 163 m (535 ft)
- Lowest elevation: 116 m (381 ft)
- Population (2023): 129
  - Density: 7.83/km^{2} (20.3/sq mi)
- Time zone: UTC+01:00 (CET)
  - Summer (DST): UTC+02:00 (CEST)
- INSEE/Postal code: 37275 /37110
- ^{1} French Land Register data, which excludes lakes, ponds, glaciers > 1 km^{2} (0.386 sq mi or 247 acres) and river estuaries.

Villedômain (French pronunciation: [vildomɛ̃]) is a commune in the Indre-et-Loire department in central France.

== Geography ==
The village lies on the right bank of the Indrois, which flows northwest through the middle of the commune.

== Population ==
Historical population
Year	Pop.	±% p.a.
1968	234	—
1975	157	−5.54%
1982	124	−3.31%
1990	117	−0.72%
1999	122	+0.47%
2007	114	−0.84%
2012	131	+2.82%
2017	115	−2.57%
2023	129	+1.93%
Source: INSEE

== See also ==
- Communes of the Indre-et-Loire department
