= Indrois =

River in central France

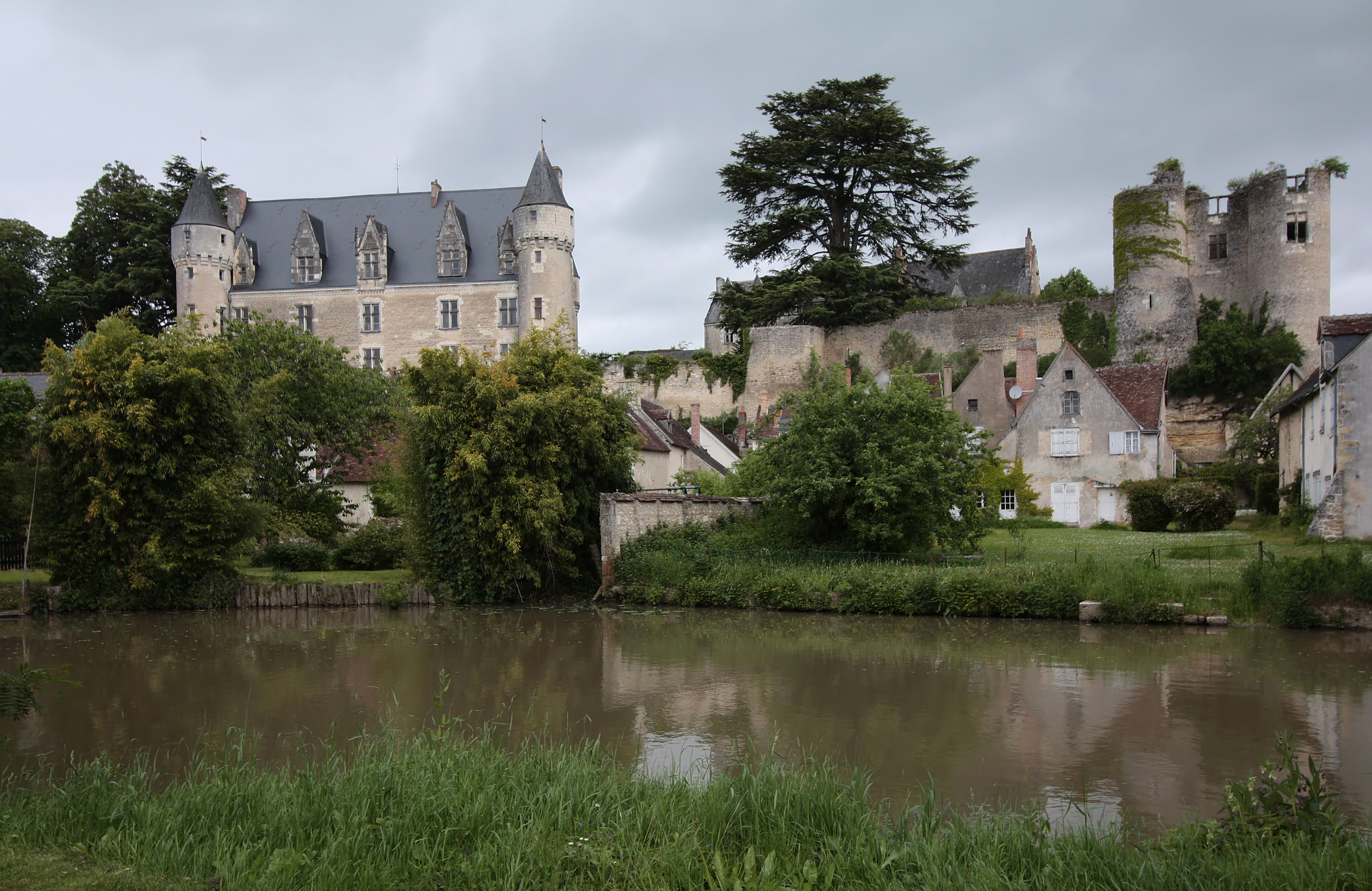
- The Indrois at Montrésor

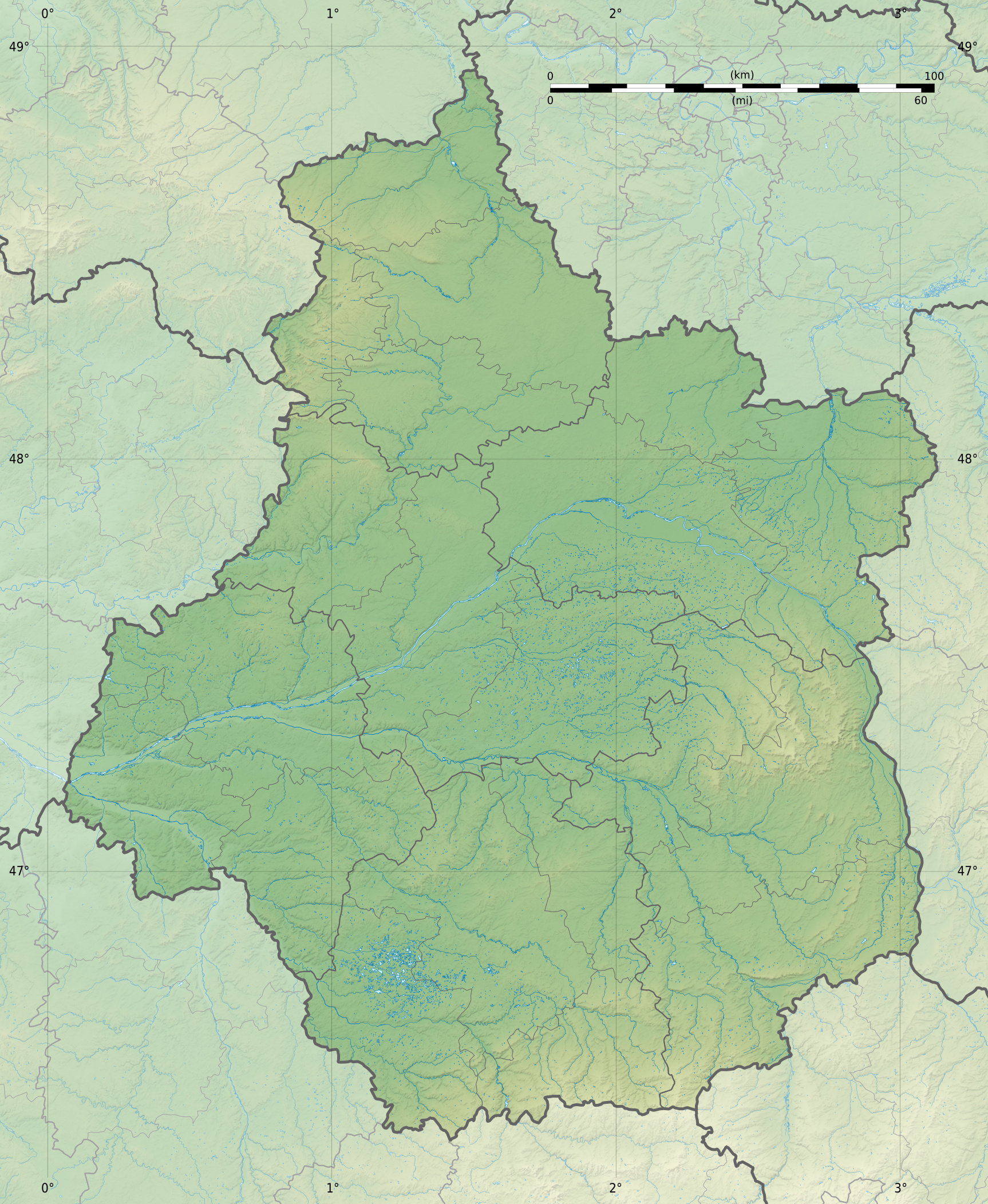
- Location within France Location within Centre-Val de Loire

Location
- Country: France

Physical characteristics
- Source
  - location: Villegouin
  - coordinates: 47°00′00″N 01°21′06″E
  - elevation: 180 m (590 ft)
- Mouth
  - location: Indre
  - coordinates: 47°12′37″N 00°56′49″E
  - elevation: 62 m (203 ft)
- Length: 59.5 km (37.0 mi)
- Basin size: 450 km^{2} (170 sq mi)
- Discharge
  - average: 2.29 m^{3}/s (81 cu ft/s)

Basin features
- Progression: Indre→ Loire→ Atlantic Ocean

The Indrois (French pronunciation: [ɛ̃dʁwa]) is a 59.5-kilometre (37.0 mi) long river in the Indre and Indre-et-Loire departments in central France. Its source is at Villegouin. It flows generally northwest. It is a right tributary of the Indre, into which it flows at Azay-sur-Indre.

== Departments and communes along its course ==
This list is ordered from source to mouth:

- Indre: Villegouin, Préaux
- Indre-et-Loire: Villedômain, Loché-sur-Indrois, Villeloin-Coulangé, Montrésor, Chemillé-sur-Indrois, Beaumont-Village, Genillé, Saint-Quentin-sur-Indrois, Chédigny, Azay-sur-Indre,
