= Azay-sur-Indre =

- Commune
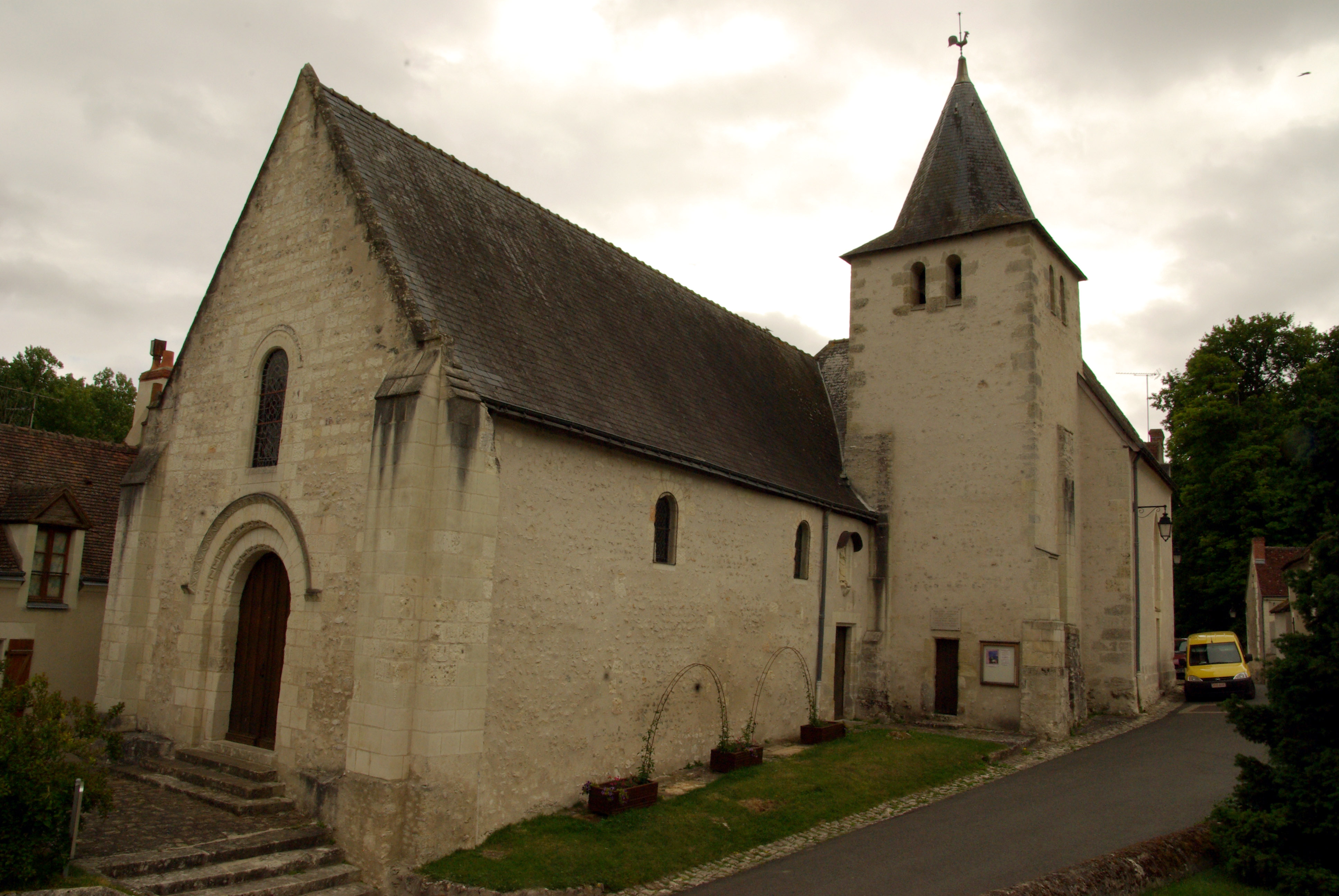
- The church in Azay-sur-Indre

- Coat of arms
- Location of Azay-sur-Indre
- Location within France Location within Centre-Val de Loire
- Coordinates: 47°12′35″N 0°56′46″E
- Country: France
- Region: Centre-Val de Loire
- Department: Indre-et-Loire
- Arrondissement: Loches
- Canton: Loches
- Intercommunality: CC Loches Sud Touraine

Government
  - Mayor (2020–2026): Jean-Jacques Meunier
- Area^{1}: 13.89 km^{2} (5.36 sq mi)
- Highest elevation: 106 m (348 ft)
- Lowest elevation: 61 m (200 ft)
- Population (2023): 363
  - Density: 26.1/km^{2} (67.7/sq mi)
- Time zone: UTC+01:00 (CET)
  - Summer (DST): UTC+02:00 (CEST)
- INSEE/Postal code: 37016 /37310
- ^{1} French Land Register data, which excludes lakes, ponds, glaciers > 1 km^{2} (0.386 sq mi or 247 acres) and river estuaries.

Azay-sur-Indre (French pronunciation: [azɛ syʁ ɛ̃dʁ], literally Azay on Indre) is a commune in the Indre-et-Loire department in central France.

== Geography ==
The Indrois flows west through the eastern part of the commune, then flows into the Indre.

The village lies in the middle of the commune, on the left bank of the Indre, which flows northwest through the middle of the commune.

== Population ==
Historical population
Year	Pop.	±% p.a.
1968	307	—
1975	272	−1.71%
1982	289	+0.87%
1990	309	+0.84%
1999	355	+1.55%
2007	379	+0.82%
2012	389	+0.52%
2017	385	−0.21%
2023	363	−0.98%
Source: INSEE

== See also ==
- Communes of the Indre-et-Loire department
