= Préaux, Indre =

Préaux
- Commune
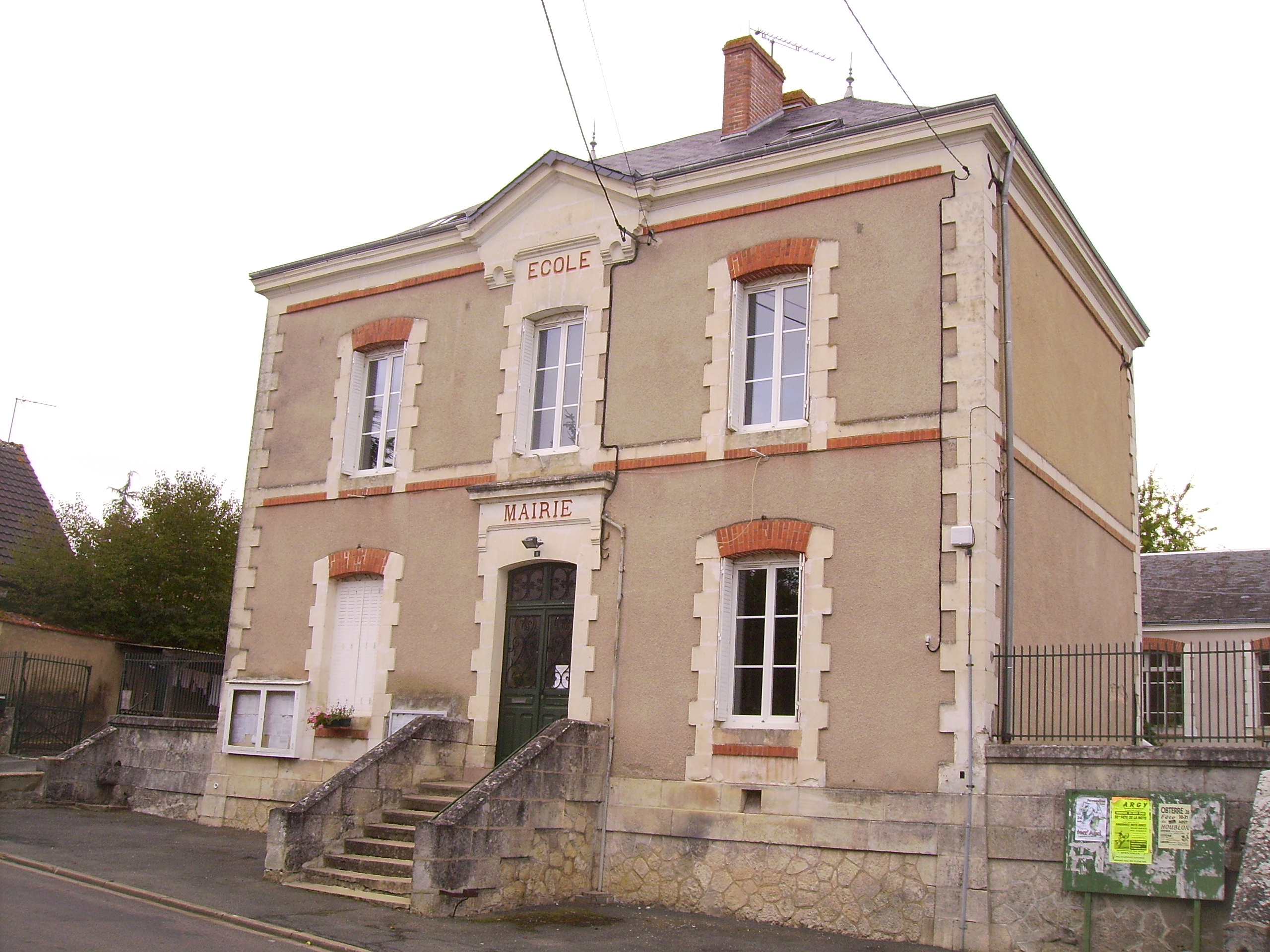
- The town hall in Préaux
- Location of Préaux
- Location within France Location within Centre-Val de Loire
- Coordinates: 47°01′19″N 1°17′36″E
- Country: France
- Region: Centre-Val de Loire
- Department: Indre
- Arrondissement: Châteauroux
- Canton: Valençay
- Intercommunality: Écueillé-Valençay

Government
  - Mayor (2020–2026): Guy Lévêque
- Area^{1}: 32.54 km^{2} (12.56 sq mi)
- Elevation: 146 m (479 ft)
- Highest elevation: 194 m (636 ft)
- Lowest elevation: 124 m (407 ft)
- Population (2023): 172
  - Density: 5.29/km^{2} (13.7/sq mi)
- Time zone: UTC+01:00 (CET)
  - Summer (DST): UTC+02:00 (CEST)
- INSEE/Postal code: 36166 /36240
- ^{1} French Land Register data, which excludes lakes, ponds, glaciers > 1 km^{2} (0.386 sq mi or 247 acres) and river estuaries.

Préaux (French pronunciation: [pʁeo]) is a commune in the Indre department in central France.

== Geography ==
The village lies on the left bank of the Indrois, which flows northwest through the southern part of the commune and forms part of its western border.

== Population ==
Historical population
Year	Pop.	±% p.a.
1968	378	—
1975	332	−1.84%
1982	249	−4.03%
1990	227	−1.15%
1999	184	−2.31%
2007	166	−1.28%
2012	160	−0.73%
2017	161	+0.12%
2023	172	+1.11%
Source: INSEE

== See also ==
- Communes of the Indre department
