= Josèphe Jacquiot =

French numismatist and politician (1910–1995)

- Born: 24 April 1910; Loches, France
- Died: 2 August 1995 (aged 85); Villeneuve-Saint-Georges, France
- Resting place: Perrusson
- Monuments: Musée municipal Josèphe Jacquiot
- Education: École du Louvre
- Occupations: Numismatist, politician

Josèphe Jacquiot (French pronunciation: [ʒozɛf ʒakio]; 24 April 1910 – 2 August 1995) was a French Resistance fighter, numismatist, and politician. Noted for her work on the medals of Louis XIV and Louis XV, she was also the founder of the first co-educational school in the Île-de-France and a museum in her home of Montgeron; she also served as mayor of the town. The museum was later renamed in her honour as Musée Josèphe Jacquiot.

== Biography ==
Jacquiot was born on 24 April 1910 in Loches. Her family moved to Montgeron after the death of her father in 1938. She graduated from higher education in history and geography from the École du Louvre. During the Second World War she joined the local Resistance.

In May 1945 Jacquiot was elected mayor of Montgeron. A result of this election meant she became one of the first female mayors in France. Her tenure as mayor lasted for two years, during which time she requisitioned housing for refugees and created free medical care for some of the poorest people in the town. She lost the 1947 election. In 1949 she founded the first school in the Île-de-France area that was also co-educational.

After she lost the mayoral election, she continued her studies and forged a career in numismatics, becoming a renowned authority on medals. In 1959 she was appointed as a curator at the Cabinet des médailles in Paris. She was also a lecturer at the École du Louvre and the Monnaie de Paris. She drew on her expertise to study Claude François Menestrier's 1691 work on medals and jetons, and its subsequent editions. She was an expert on the medals of Louis XIV, as well as satirical medals of the era. Her work on the catalogue of medals of Louis XV was praised by Mark P. Jones as providing "enlightening notes, and detailed bibliographies".

She was also the founder of the Montgeron History Society, and its first president. She also founded the municipal museum of Montgeron and became its curator in 1993. Jacquiot died on 2 August 1995; she is buried in Perrusson.

== Legacy ==
Jacquiot bequeathed her medal collection to Montgeron's museum, which was subsequently renamed in her honour as Musée Josèphe Jacquiot. As of 2024, Jacquiot's work as a numismatist continued to influence the field.

== Selected works ==
- Médailles et jetons gravés en taille directe (1971, Paris: Hôtel de la Monnaie)
- La littérature et les médailles. In: Cahiers de l'Association internationale des études francaises, 1972, 24. pp. 201–213.
- Le talisman offert à Louis XIV et le carré magique au XVIIe siècle. In: Comptes rendus des séances de l'Académie des Inscriptions et Belles-Lettres, 113ᵉ année, 1, 1969. pp. 18-34.
- Jacquiot, J. (1986). La valeur d'information des médailles frappées en France et à l'Étranger, à l'occasion, ou à la suite de l'Édit de Fontainebleau. Bulletin de La Société de l'Histoire Du Protestantisme Français (1903-), 132, 63–78.
- Jacquiot, J. (1971). Dessins inédits d'Etienne Delaune pour des médailles et pour des jetons, conservés à l'Ashmolean Museum d'Oxford (résumé). Bulletin de la Société nationale des Antiquaires de France, 1969(1), 271–272.
