= Nicolas Barthélemy de Loches =

French Benedictine monk

Nicolas Barthélemy de Loches (1478 in Loches – beginning of 1538) was a French Benedictine monk. He was professor of law at the University of Orléans then in Paris, and prior to Notre-Dame de Bonne-Nouvelle until 1537, when we lose track of him.

== Short biography ==
In 1512, he published an edition of Columelle et Paladius by the printer Josse Bade. His first literary work was probably composed between 1512 and 1515; it was a comic and satirical play entitled Momiae. He also wrote in Latin a religious tragedy with 2000 verse, Christus xylonicus ("Christ winner of the Cross"), which was published in 1529. He also authored numerous religious poems and satirical epigrams, and achieved some notoriety in his time: his poem Ennoea ad sospitalem Christum was imitated by Clément Marot in L'Adolescence clémentine and Rabelais probably found inspiration for his Pantagruel in one of his epigrams.

He was one of the earliest French authors of religious tragedy, although the Christus xylonicus still bore the marks of medieval mysteries. Influences of Plautus and Terence could also be found. Nicolas Barthélemy de Loches (1478-after 1537) is a Benedictine monk born in Loches, in Indre-et-Loire, in 1478. He was professor of law at the University of Orleans, then in Paris, and prior at Notre -Lady of Bonne-Nouvelle until 1537, when we lose track of it.

== Bibliography ==
Raymond Lebègue: La tragédie religieuse en France. Les débuts (1514-1573), Librairie Ancienne Honoré Champion, Paris 1929, (p. 163-193).

== See also ==
- French Renaissance literature
