= Saint-Quentin-sur-Indrois =

- Commune
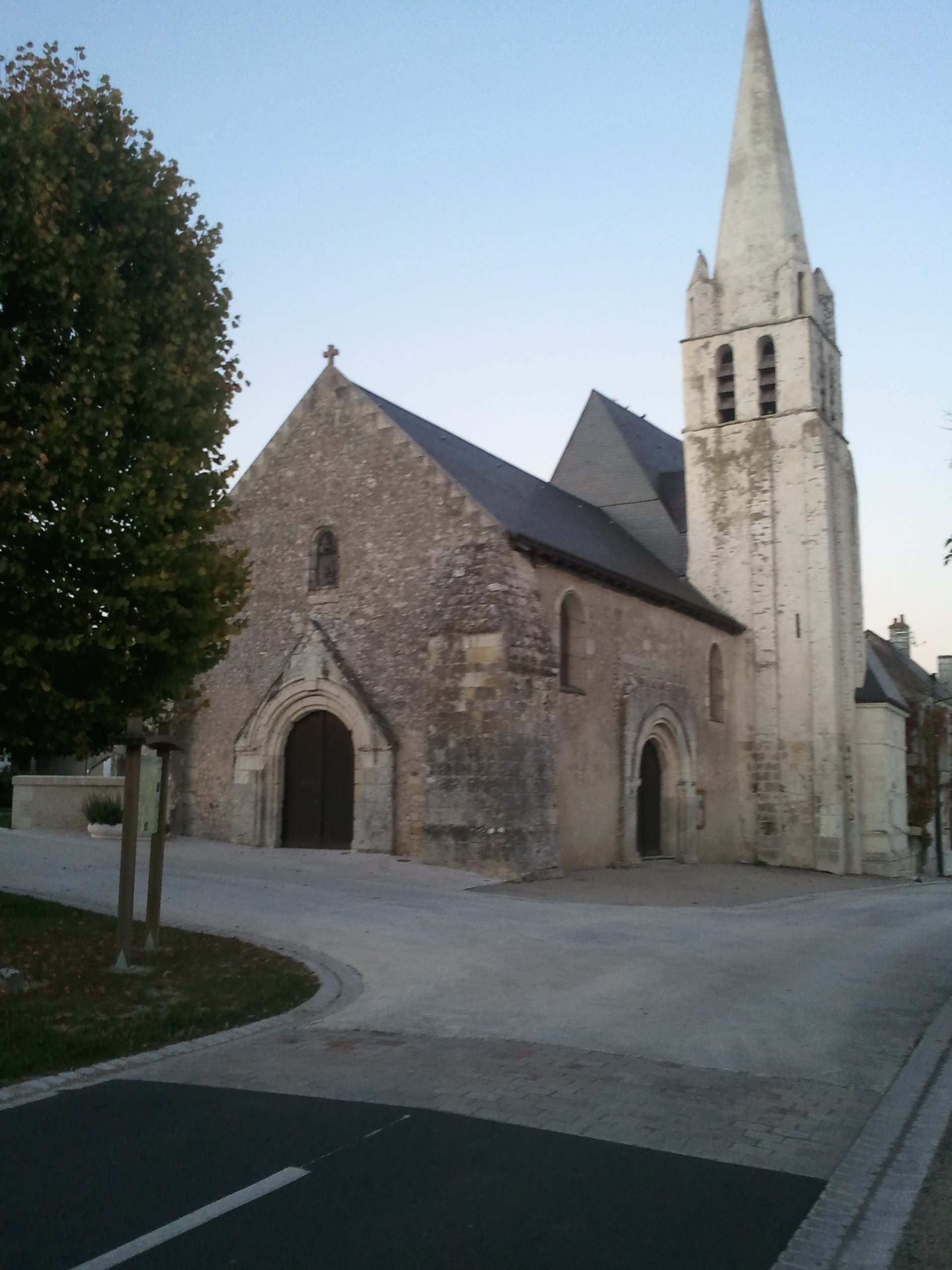
- The church of Saint-Quentin, in Saint-Quentin-sur-Indrois
- Location of Saint-Quentin-sur-Indrois
- Location within France Location within Centre-Val de Loire
- Coordinates: 47°12′15″N 1°01′28″E
- Country: France
- Region: Centre-Val de Loire
- Department: Indre-et-Loire
- Arrondissement: Loches
- Canton: Loches
- Intercommunality: CC Loches Sud Touraine

Government
  - Mayor (2020–2026): Cécile Deruyver-Averland
- Area^{1}: 27.23 km^{2} (10.51 sq mi)
- Highest elevation: 127 m (417 ft)
- Lowest elevation: 65 m (213 ft)
- Population (2023): 484
  - Density: 17.8/km^{2} (46.0/sq mi)
- Time zone: UTC+01:00 (CET)
  - Summer (DST): UTC+02:00 (CEST)
- INSEE/Postal code: 37234 /37310
- ^{1} French Land Register data, which excludes lakes, ponds, glaciers > 1 km^{2} (0.386 sq mi or 247 acres) and river estuaries.

Saint-Quentin-sur-Indrois (French pronunciation: [sɛ̃ kɑ̃tɛ̃ syʁ ɛ̃dʁwa], literally Saint-Quentin on Indrois) is a commune in the Indre-et-Loire department in central France.

== Geography ==
The village lies in the middle of the commune, on the right bank of the Indrois, which flows west through the middle of the commune.

== Population ==
Historical population
Year	Pop.	±% p.a.
1968	440	—
1975	373	−2.33%
1982	425	+1.88%
1990	405	−0.60%
1999	429	+0.64%
2007	425	−0.12%
2012	512	+3.79%
2017	510	−0.08%
2023	484	−0.87%
Source: INSEE

== See also ==
- Communes of the Indre-et-Loire department
