= Beaumont-Village =

- Commune
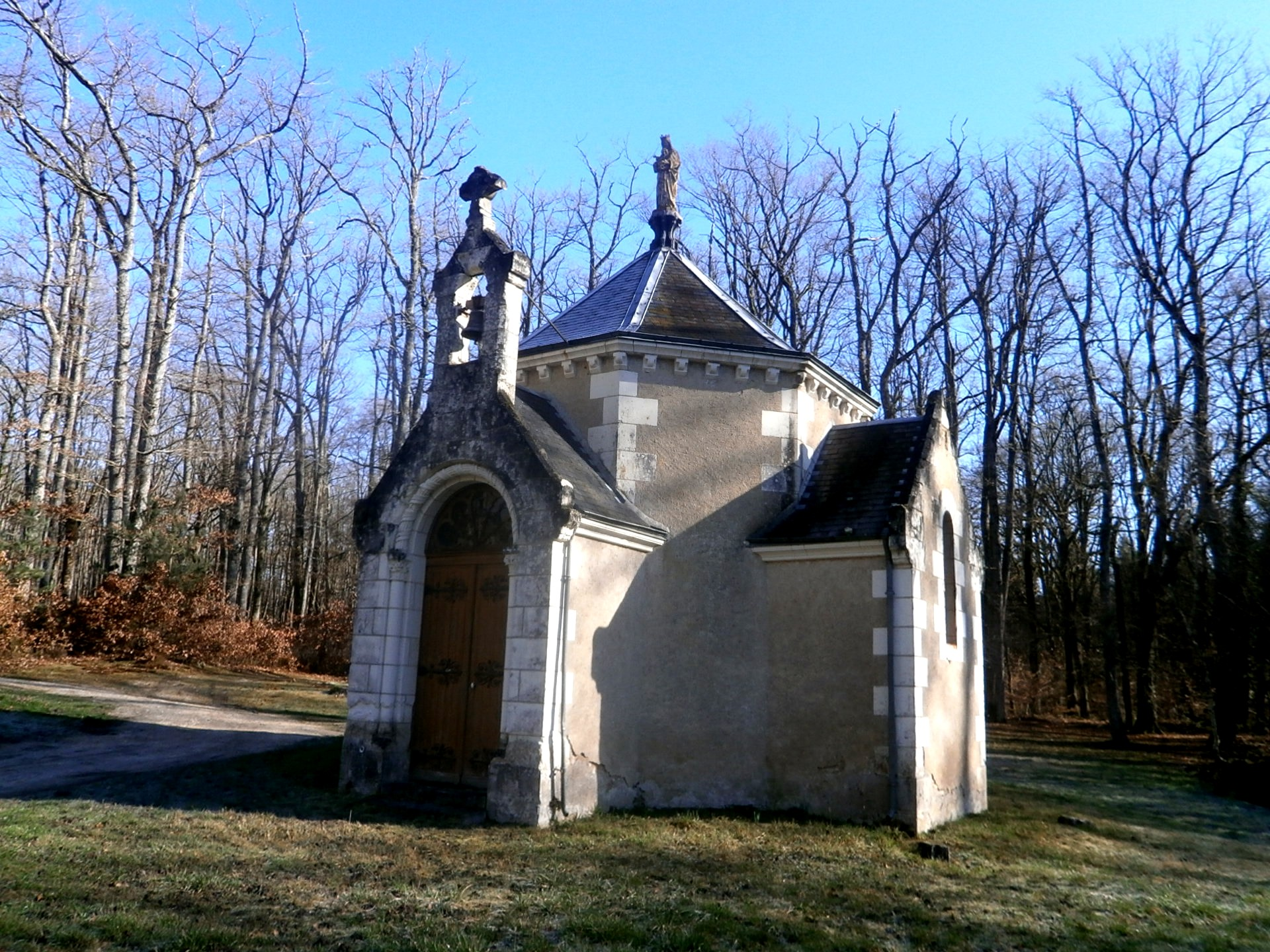
- Notre-Dame-du-Chêne chapel in Beaumont-Village.

- Coat of arms
- Location of Beaumont-Village
- Location within France Location within Centre-Val de Loire
- Coordinates: 47°10′42″N 1°12′25″E
- Country: France
- Region: Centre-Val de Loire
- Department: Indre-et-Loire
- Arrondissement: Loches
- Canton: Loches
- Intercommunality: CC Loches Sud Touraine

Government
  - Mayor (2020–2026): Michel Alonso
- Area^{1}: 19.25 km^{2} (7.43 sq mi)
- Highest elevation: 144 m (472 ft)
- Lowest elevation: 86 m (282 ft)
- Population (2023): 239
  - Density: 12.4/km^{2} (32.2/sq mi)
- Time zone: UTC+01:00 (CET)
  - Summer (DST): UTC+02:00 (CEST)
- INSEE/Postal code: 37023 /37460
- ^{1} French Land Register data, which excludes lakes, ponds, glaciers > 1 km^{2} (0.386 sq mi or 247 acres) and river estuaries.

Beaumont-Village (French pronunciation: [bomɔ̃ vilaʒ]) is a commune in the Indre-et-Loire department in central France.

== Geography ==
The Indrois forms parts of the commune's southern border.

== Population ==
Historical population
Year	Pop.	±% p.a.
1968	380	—
1975	304	−3.14%
1982	261	−2.16%
1990	242	−0.94%
1999	242	+0.00%
2007	251	+0.46%
2012	273	+1.69%
2017	259	−1.05%
2023	239	−1.33%
Source: INSEE

== See also ==
- Communes of the Indre-et-Loire department
