= Le Liège =

- Commune
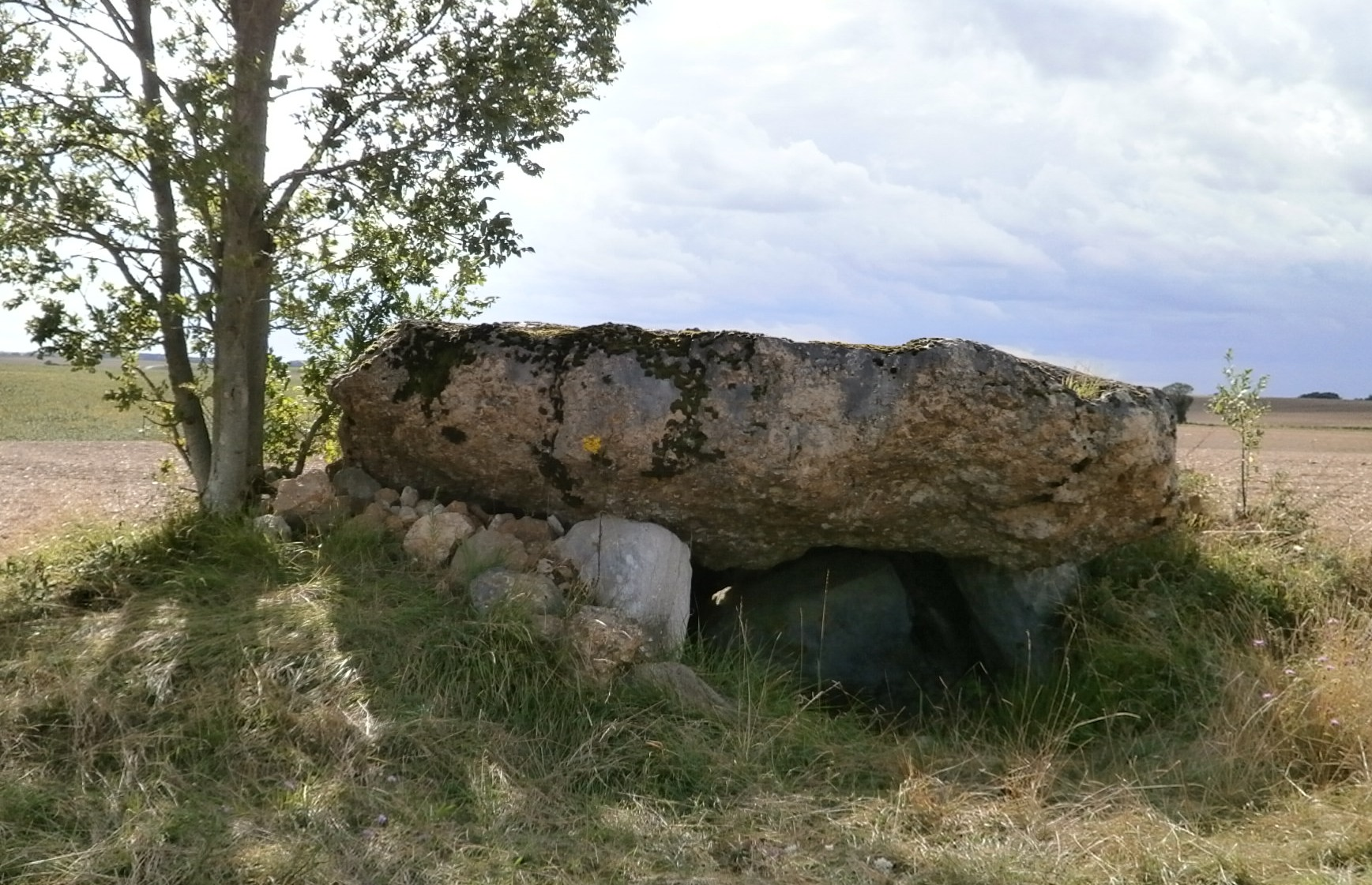
- A dolmen known as "d'Hys", in Le Liège

- Coat of arms
- Location of Le Liège
- Location within France Location within Centre-Val de Loire
- Coordinates: 47°13′46″N 1°06′16″E
- Country: France
- Region: Centre-Val de Loire
- Department: Indre-et-Loire
- Arrondissement: Loches
- Canton: Loches
- Intercommunality: CC Loches Sud Touraine

Government
  - Mayor (2020–2026): Christophe Adjadj
- Area^{1}: 11.15 km^{2} (4.31 sq mi)
- Highest elevation: 141 m (463 ft)
- Lowest elevation: 93 m (305 ft)
- Population (2023): 326
  - Density: 29.2/km^{2} (75.7/sq mi)
- Time zone: UTC+01:00 (CET)
  - Summer (DST): UTC+02:00 (CEST)
- INSEE/Postal code: 37127 /37460
- ^{1} French Land Register data, which excludes lakes, ponds, glaciers > 1 km^{2} (0.386 sq mi or 247 acres) and river estuaries.

Le Liège (French pronunciation: [lə ljɛʒ]) is a commune in the Indre-et-Loire department in central France.

== Population ==
Historical population
Year	Pop.	±% p.a.
1968	250	—
1975	203	−2.93%
1982	186	−1.24%
1990	209	+1.47%
1999	227	+0.92%
2007	335	+4.99%
2012	340	+0.30%
2017	364	+1.37%
2023	326	−1.82%
Source: INSEE

== See also ==
- Communes of the Indre-et-Loire department
