= Canton of Loches =

Coordinates: 47.13°N 0.99°E

The canton of Loches is an administrative division of the Indre-et-Loire department, central France. Its borders were modified at the French canton reorganisation which came into effect in March 2015. Its seat is in Loches.

It consists of the following communes:

1. Azay-sur-Indre
2. Beaulieu-lès-Loches
3. Beaumont-Village
4. Bridoré
5. Chambourg-sur-Indre
6. Chanceaux-près-Loches
7. Chédigny
8. Chemillé-sur-Indrois
9. Dolus-le-Sec
10. Ferrière-sur-Beaulieu
11. Genillé
12. Le Liège
13. Loché-sur-Indrois
14. Loches
15. Montrésor
16. Nouans-les-Fontaines
17. Orbigny
18. Perrusson
19. Reignac-sur-Indre
20. Saint-Hippolyte
21. Saint-Jean-Saint-Germain
22. Saint-Quentin-sur-Indrois
23. Saint-Senoch
24. Sennevières
25. Tauxigny-Saint-Bauld
26. Verneuil-sur-Indre
27. Villedômain
28. Villeloin-Coulangé
