= Saint-Hippolyte, Indre-et-Loire =

Saint-Hippolyte
- Commune
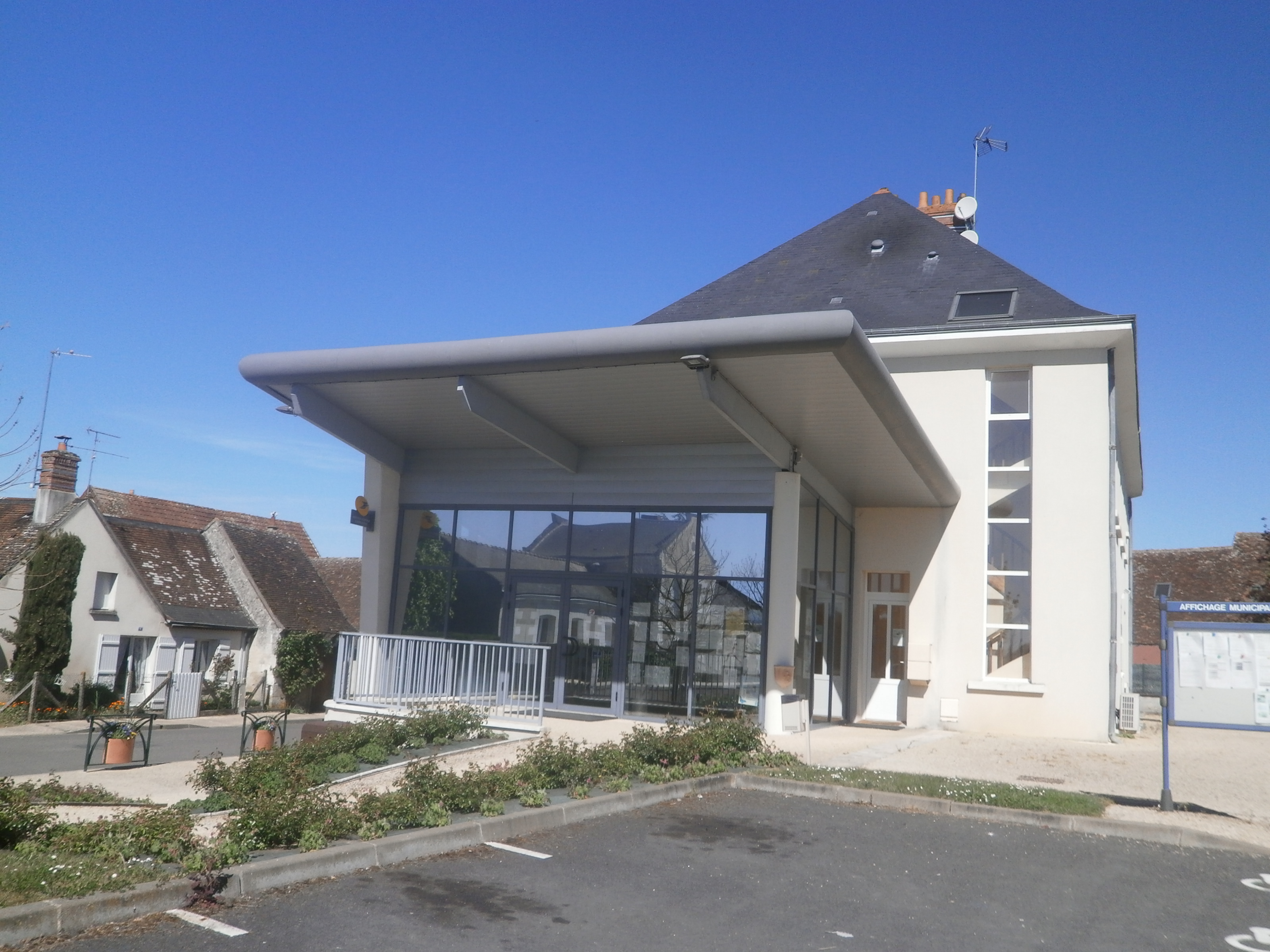
- Saint-Hippolyte Town hall
- Location of Saint-Hippolyte
- Location within France Location within Centre-Val de Loire
- Coordinates: 47°03′39″N 1°06′03″E
- Country: France
- Region: Centre-Val de Loire
- Department: Indre-et-Loire
- Arrondissement: Loches
- Canton: Loches
- Intercommunality: CC Loches Sud Touraine

Government
  - Mayor (2020–2026): Patrick Pasquier
- Area^{1}: 32.99 km^{2} (12.74 sq mi)
- Highest elevation: 152 m (499 ft)
- Lowest elevation: 75 m (246 ft)
- Population (2023): 638
  - Density: 19.3/km^{2} (50.1/sq mi)
- Time zone: UTC+01:00 (CET)
  - Summer (DST): UTC+02:00 (CEST)
- INSEE/Postal code: 37221 /37600
- ^{1} French Land Register data, which excludes lakes, ponds, glaciers > 1 km^{2} (0.386 sq mi or 247 acres) and river estuaries.

Saint-Hippolyte (French pronunciation: [sɛ̃.t‿ipɔlit]) is a commune in the Indre-et-Loire department in central France.

== Population ==
Historical population
Year	Pop.	±% p.a.
1968	782	—
1975	634	−2.95%
1982	636	+0.05%
1990	627	−0.18%
1999	567	−1.11%
2007	553	−0.31%
2012	607	+1.88%
2017	646	+1.25%
2023	638	−0.21%
Source: INSEE

== See also ==
- Communes of the Indre-et-Loire department
