= Villegouin =

- Commune
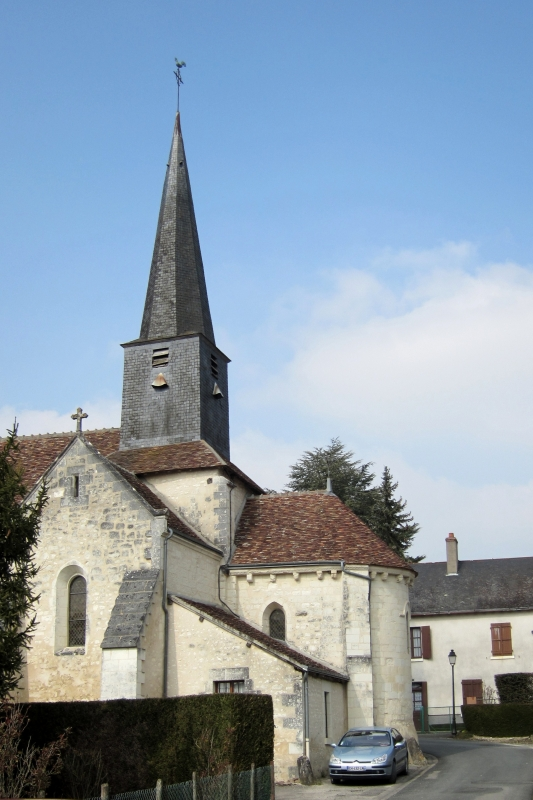
- The church of Our Lady, in Villegouin

- Coat of arms
- Location of Villegouin
- Location within France Location within Centre-Val de Loire
- Coordinates: 46°57′54″N 1°22′26″E
- Country: France
- Region: Centre-Val de Loire
- Department: Indre
- Arrondissement: Châteauroux
- Canton: Valençay
- Intercommunality: Écueillé-Valençay

Government
  - Mayor (2020–2026): Michel Brunet
- Area^{1}: 24.03 km^{2} (9.28 sq mi)
- Elevation: 125 m (410 ft)
- Highest elevation: 201 m (659 ft)
- Lowest elevation: 101 m (331 ft)
- Population (2023): 325
  - Density: 13.5/km^{2} (35.0/sq mi)
- Time zone: UTC+01:00 (CET)
  - Summer (DST): UTC+02:00 (CEST)
- INSEE/Postal code: 36243 /36500
- ^{1} French Land Register data, which excludes lakes, ponds, glaciers > 1 km^{2} (0.386 sq mi or 247 acres) and river estuaries.

Villegouin (French pronunciation: [vil.ɡwɛ̃]) is a commune in the Indre department in central France.

== Geography ==
The Indrois has its source in the commune.

== Population ==
Historical population
Year	Pop.	±% p.a.
1968	521	—
1975	456	−1.89%
1982	401	−1.82%
1990	410	+0.28%
1999	411	+0.03%
2007	402	−0.28%
2012	375	−1.38%
2017	331	−2.47%
2023	325	−0.30%
Source: INSEE

== See also ==
- Communes of the Indre department
