= La Celle-Guenand =

- Commune
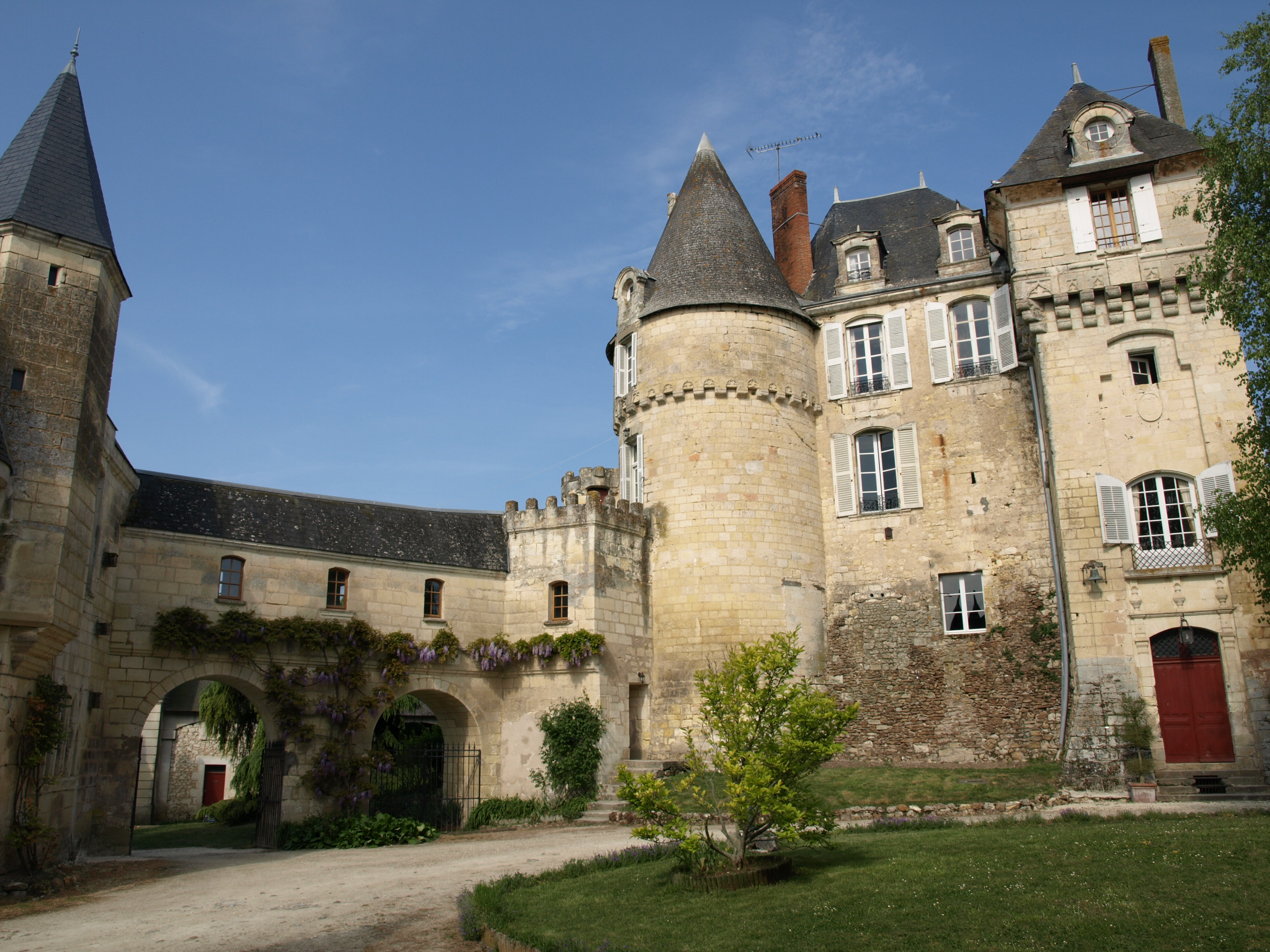
- Chateau
- Location of La Celle-Guenand
- Location within France Location within Centre-Val de Loire
- Coordinates: 46°56′41″N 0°53′41″E
- Country: France
- Region: Centre-Val de Loire
- Department: Indre-et-Loire
- Arrondissement: Loches
- Canton: Descartes
- Intercommunality: CC Loches Sud Touraine

Government
  - Mayor (2020–2026): Alain Morève
- Area^{1}: 36.7 km^{2} (14.2 sq mi)
- Elevation: 82 m (269 ft)
- Highest elevation: 144 m (472 ft)
- Lowest elevation: 70 m (230 ft)
- Population (2023): 379
  - Density: 10.3/km^{2} (26.7/sq mi)
- Time zone: UTC+01:00 (CET)
  - Summer (DST): UTC+02:00 (CEST)
- INSEE/Postal code: 37044 /37350
- ^{1} French Land Register data, which excludes lakes, ponds, glaciers > 1 km^{2} (0.386 sq mi or 247 acres) and river estuaries.

La Celle-Guenand (French pronunciation: [la sɛl ɡənɑ̃]) is a commune in the Indre-et-Loire department in central France.

== Population ==
Historical population
Year	Pop.	±% p.a.
1968	509	—
1975	420	−2.71%
1982	365	−1.99%
1990	412	+1.53%
1999	362	−1.43%
2007	378	+0.54%
2012	387	+0.47%
2017	372	−0.79%
2023	379	+0.31%
Source: INSEE

== See also ==
- Château de La Celle-Guenand
- Communes of the Indre-et-Loire department
