= Chédigny =

- Commune
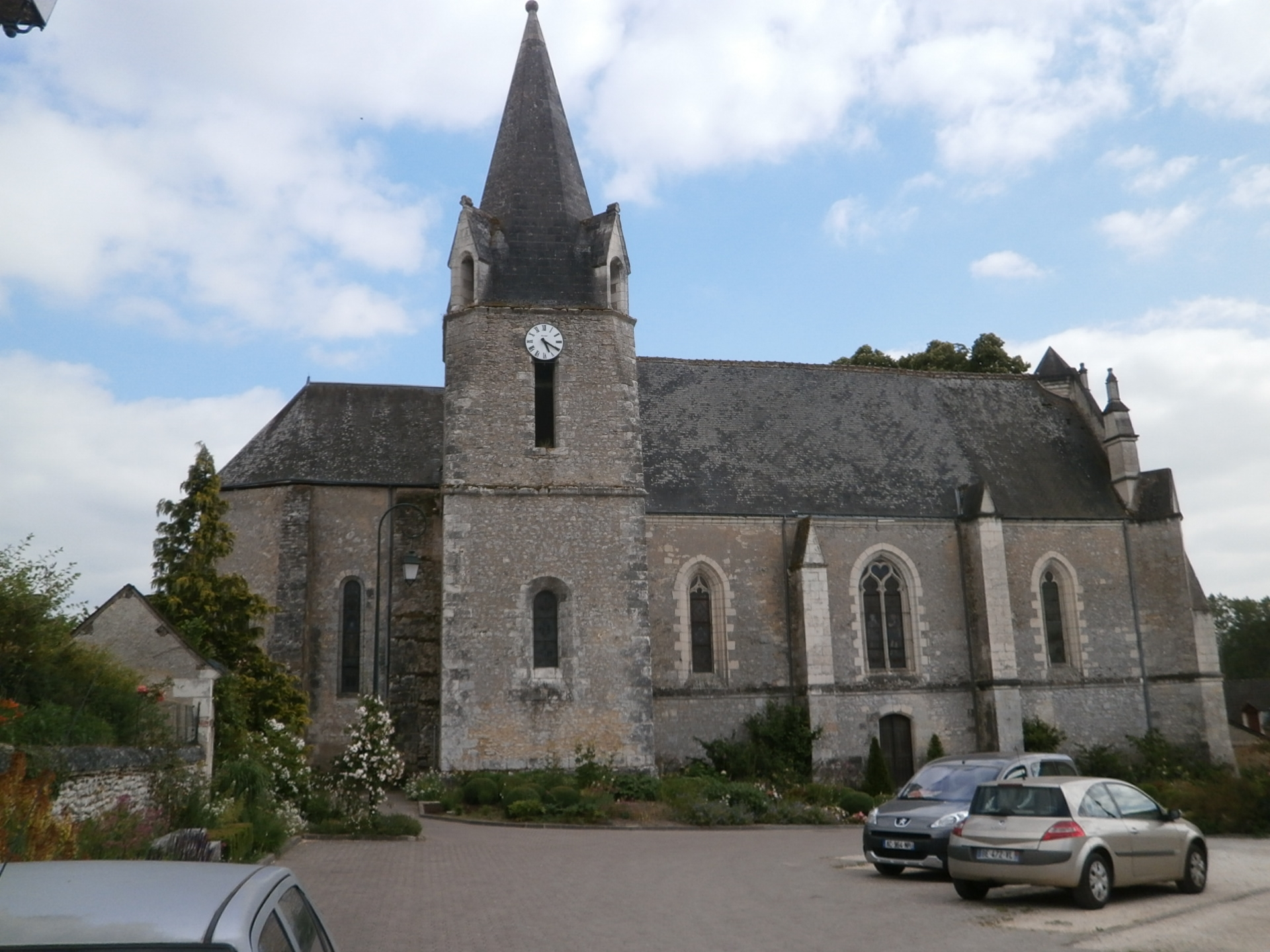
- The church of Saint-Pierre-ès-Liens, in Chédigny

- Coat of arms
- Location of Chédigny
- Location within France Location within Centre-Val de Loire
- Coordinates: 47°12′39″N 1°00′01″E
- Country: France
- Region: Centre-Val de Loire
- Department: Indre-et-Loire
- Arrondissement: Loches
- Canton: Loches
- Intercommunality: CC Loches Sud Touraine

Government
  - Mayor (2020–2026): Pascal Dugué
- Area^{1}: 23.17 km^{2} (8.95 sq mi)
- Highest elevation: 110 m (360 ft)
- Lowest elevation: 62 m (203 ft)
- Population (2023): 566
  - Density: 24.4/km^{2} (63.3/sq mi)
- Time zone: UTC+01:00 (CET)
  - Summer (DST): UTC+02:00 (CEST)
- INSEE/Postal code: 37066 /37310
- ^{1} French Land Register data, which excludes lakes, ponds, glaciers > 1 km^{2} (0.386 sq mi or 247 acres) and river estuaries.

Chédigny (French pronunciation: [ʃediɲi]) is a commune in the Indre-et-Loire department in central France.

== Geography ==
The village lies on the right bank of the Indrois, which flows northwest through the southern part of the commune.

== Population ==
Historical population
Year	Pop.	±% p.a.
1968	431	—
1975	394	−1.27%
1982	420	+0.92%
1990	445	+0.73%
1999	435	−0.25%
2007	529	+2.48%
2012	561	+1.18%
2017	558	−0.11%
2023	566	+0.24%
Source: INSEE

== See also ==
- Communes of the Indre-et-Loire department
