= Beaulieu-lès-Loches =

- Commune
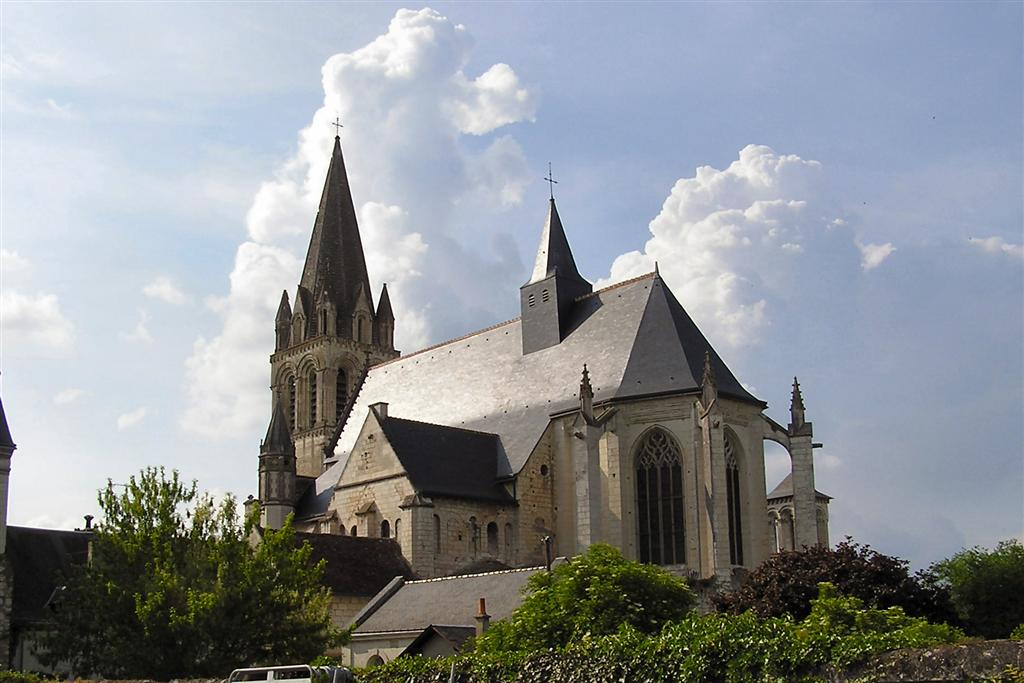
- Abbey church

- Coat of arms
- Location of Beaulieu-lès-Loches
- Location within France Location within Centre-Val de Loire
- Coordinates: 47°07′45″N 1°00′58″E
- Country: France
- Region: Centre-Val de Loire
- Department: Indre-et-Loire
- Arrondissement: Loches
- Canton: Loches
- Intercommunality: CC Loches Sud Touraine

Government
  - Mayor (2022–2026): Sophie Métadier
- Area^{1}: 3.88 km^{2} (1.50 sq mi)
- Elevation: 72 m (236 ft)
- Highest elevation: 121 m (397 ft)
- Lowest elevation: 68 m (223 ft)
- Population (2023): 1,733
  - Density: 447/km^{2} (1,160/sq mi)
- Time zone: UTC+01:00 (CET)
  - Summer (DST): UTC+02:00 (CEST)
- INSEE/Postal code: 37020 /37600
- ^{1} French Land Register data, which excludes lakes, ponds, glaciers > 1 km^{2} (0.386 sq mi or 247 acres) and river estuaries.

Beaulieu-lès-Loches (French pronunciation: [boljø lɛ lɔʃ], literally Beaulieu near Loches) is a commune in the Indre-et-Loire department in central France.

== History ==
A great abbey church named Belli Locus dedicated to the Holy Sepulchre was founded in the early 11th century by Fulk Nerra, Count of Anjou, who is buried in the chancel. In 1011 Pope Sergius IV donated some relics of Saints Chrysanthus and Daria and Fulk himself a piece of the Holy Sepulchre he stole from his visit to Jerusalem to the abbey. The pope settled a dispute over the abbey's consecration with the Archbishop of Tours by himself sending a legate to consecrate it.

Around the abbey, a town developed, with a charter of rights for a market and fairs. A mint was permitted at the abbey. Beaulieu was once the seat of a barony.

Here, Henry III of France signed the Edict of Beaulieu in 1576 to put an end to the fifth war of religion, granting Protestants better rights. Soon after, the sixth war of religion started.

Beaulieu had, in the past, a more successful economical life than that of its near neighbours in Loches, until the 19th century. The town declined after that and now is considered no more than a suburb of Loches. As evidence of the decline, from the demographic standpoint, the decrease from 1750 inhabitants (in 1769) to 1720 (in 1999) occurred over a period when the total French population has more than doubled.

Beaulieu was renamed Beaulieu-lès-Loches on 1 March 1957.

== Population ==
Historical population
Year	Pop.	±% p.a.
1968	1,756	—
1975	1,769	+0.11%
1982	1,768	−0.01%
1990	1,864	+0.66%
1999	1,720	−0.89%
2007	1,686	−0.25%
2012	1,787	+1.17%
2017	1,767	−0.22%
2023	1,733	−0.32%
Source: INSEE

The inhabitants are known as Bellilociens in French.

== Sights ==
Three churches were built in the town: Saint Laurent, St. Pierre and St André. Today, only Saint Laurent stands, dating from the fifteenth century and comprising the chancel and one transept of the abbey of the Holy Sepulchre. Of the abbey, the Romanesque nave is in ruins, but of the two towers one survives intact; it is square, crowned with an octagonal steeple of stone, and is one of the finest extant monuments of Romanesque architecture. Only vestigial traces remain of the other two churches.

There once existed an aristocratic neighbourhood, the House of the Templars and the house of the "Salt Attic" being most notable buildings. Of the abbey’s minor buildings, the Prior’s house and some convent buildings (where the Town Hall is now located) still exist, as well as the cloisters and gardens surrounding the abbey.

The Convent of the Viantaises, now all but gone, was founded in 1643 by Catherine-Angélique and Rénée-Thérèse of Boursault, daughters of the Marquis of Viantais, the lord of Bridoré. The nuns that lived there were the "Sisters of the order of St Augustine, Daughters of the mother of God" and they came from the grandest families in the region. Isolated from the world by a five-meters-high wall, the convent was situated in a poorly drained marshy area, harmful to the health of the nuns, several of whom died early, of various fevers. This convent was dissolved in 1791, following the opposition of the nuns to the reorganization of the Catholic Church brought about by the French Revolution.

=== Outside the town ===
The remains of the chapel of a leper colony (La Madeleine), built in the 12th century, is still visible outside the walls of the town. You can see the canal of Beaulieu, built on the orders of the monks, to drain the waters of the Indre and facilitate the construction of mills. Some walls are still visible but the gateways were destroyed at the end of the 18th century because they interfered with timber transportation. One other notable building, the Chevaleau tower, dates back to the 12th century, a small keep on the route de Jerusalem .

During the Hundred Years War, the town was besieged, sacked and generally used and abused by the troops besieging the fortress of Loches. After this difficult period, the town of Beaulieu never really recovered. Despite the return of the kings to Touraine (Charles VII of France having lived in Loches) and the re-installation of some noble families in the town (for example, the house of Agnès Sorel), the position did not improve. The Wars of Religion saw a return to more disturbances in the town, which eventually put itself gently to sleep.

== See also ==
- Communes of the Indre-et-Loire department
