= Bridoré =

- Commune
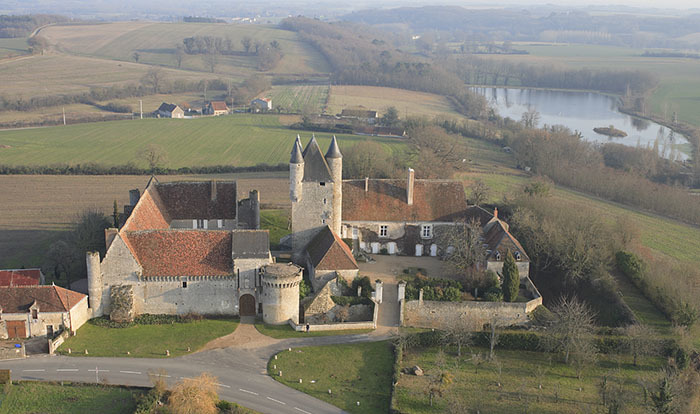
- Chateau
- Location of Bridoré
- Location within France Location within Centre-Val de Loire
- Coordinates: 47°01′40″N 1°05′00″E
- Country: France
- Region: Centre-Val de Loire
- Department: Indre-et-Loire
- Arrondissement: Loches
- Canton: Loches
- Intercommunality: CC Loches Sud Touraine

Government
  - Mayor (2020–2026): Pascale Morel
- Area^{1}: 14.54 km^{2} (5.61 sq mi)
- Highest elevation: 144 m (472 ft)
- Lowest elevation: 76 m (249 ft)
- Population (2023): 491
  - Density: 33.8/km^{2} (87.5/sq mi)
- Time zone: UTC+01:00 (CET)
  - Summer (DST): UTC+02:00 (CEST)
- INSEE/Postal code: 37039 /37600
- ^{1} French Land Register data, which excludes lakes, ponds, glaciers > 1 km^{2} (0.386 sq mi or 247 acres) and river estuaries.

Bridoré (French pronunciation: [bʁidɔʁe]) is a commune in the Indre-et-Loire department in central France.

== Population ==
Historical population
Year	Pop.	±% p.a.
1968	373	—
1975	363	−0.39%
1982	426	+2.31%
1990	461	+0.99%
1999	476	+0.36%
2007	500	+0.62%
2012	538	+1.48%
2017	524	−0.53%
2023	491	−1.08%
Source: INSEE

== See also ==
- Communes of the Indre-et-Loire department
