= Château de Montrésor =

Medieval castle with a Renaissance mansion in the grounds in Montrésor, France

Coordinates: 47°9′21″N 1°12′5″E

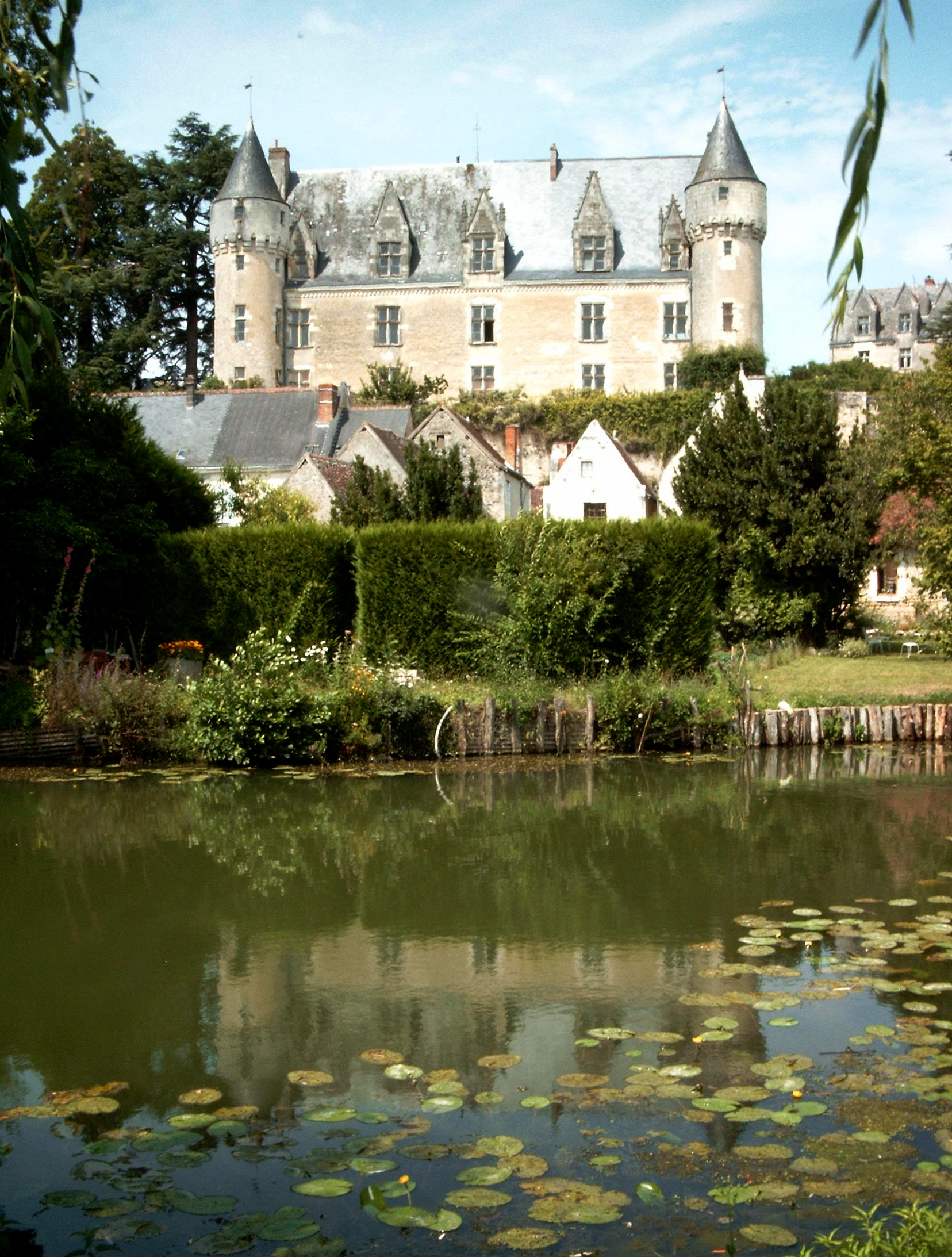
The Château de Montrésor

The Château de Montrésor is a medieval castle with a Renaissance mansion built in the grounds, located in the French village of Montrésor in the département of Indre-et-Loire.

The Château de Montrésor has been listed since 1996 as a monument historique by the French Ministry of Culture and is a popular visitor attraction.

== History ==
=== Medieval fortress ===
Around 1005, Fulk Nerra, count of Anjou, chose a rocky overhang dominating the valley of the Indrois as the site to have a powerful fortress built by his captain Roger le Petit Diable ("Little Devil"). Montrésor had one of the first keeps built out of stone, similar to that at Loches, and two circular walls, of which today only the west wall remains. In the 12th century, Montrésor fell into the hands of Henry II of England and the imposing towers at the entrance were built, as well as a part of the northern curtain wall. In 1188, King Philip Augustus of France retook Montrésor from the English. André de Chauvigny, returning from the Third Crusade with Richard the Lionheart, became the new lord of Montrésor, before having to cede the castle for almost two centuries to the Palluau family.

Demolished in 1203, the castle was rebuilt in 1393 for Jean IV de Bueil by Jean Binet, who put up the enclosure wall, the gatehouse and the existing outbuildings.

=== Renaissance mansion ===
From the start of the 15th century, with the royal court spending more and more time in Touraine, Montrésor became a centre for courtiers and royal servants. In 1493, Imbert de Batarnay bought Montrésor to build an elegant residence in the feudal enclosure, of which only the main wing remains. Imbert was an influential councillor and chamberlain to four kings of France: Louis XI, Charles VIII, Louis XI and Francis I. His long tenure in this office was rare at the time, but he was skilful and cunning, and was present at all of the negotiations in his time - he was particularly responsible for arranging the marriage of Anne of Brittany to the king, sealing the joining of the Duchy of Brittany to the French kingdom. He was entrusted with preparations for war with Italy and the education of the children of Louis XII and François I.

=== A Polish landlord and benefactor ===
During the 17th and 18th centuries, other leading families - such as the Bourdeilles and the Beauvilliers - lived in the castle. The French Revolution marked the beginning of its decline. Around 1845, Count Louis-Jouffroy de Gonsans demolished the west wing of the Renaissance logis as well as the castle chapel.

In 1849, the mother of a Polish exiled magnate, Count Xavier Branicki, bought the dilapidated estate as a project for her son. He was a friend of Emperor Napoleon III and, when he arrived, he gave new life to the village of Montrésor; he built new schools for girls and boys, restored the water supply, repaired the hospital and built a chapel in the grave-yard. Branicki had the castle completely restored. Over twenty years, he put on new roofs and equipped the interior with rich furnishings and art. He made his home into an archive and repository of polonica, Polish historical artefacts, which has now become a notable collection and museum. The house and its estate were the setting for hunting in the surrounding forests and sumptuous feasts with prince Napoléon, a cousin of the Emperor. Branicki had no legitimate heirs and the property passed to his younger brother, Konstanty. That line also came to an end. The castle is now owned by distant relatives by marriage and descendants of Mikolaj Rej.

== See also ==
- List of castles in France
- Saint-Jean-Baptiste de Montrésor Church
