= Xavier Branicki (1816–1879) =

Polish-French financier and writer (1816–1879)

- Franciszek Ksawery Branicki
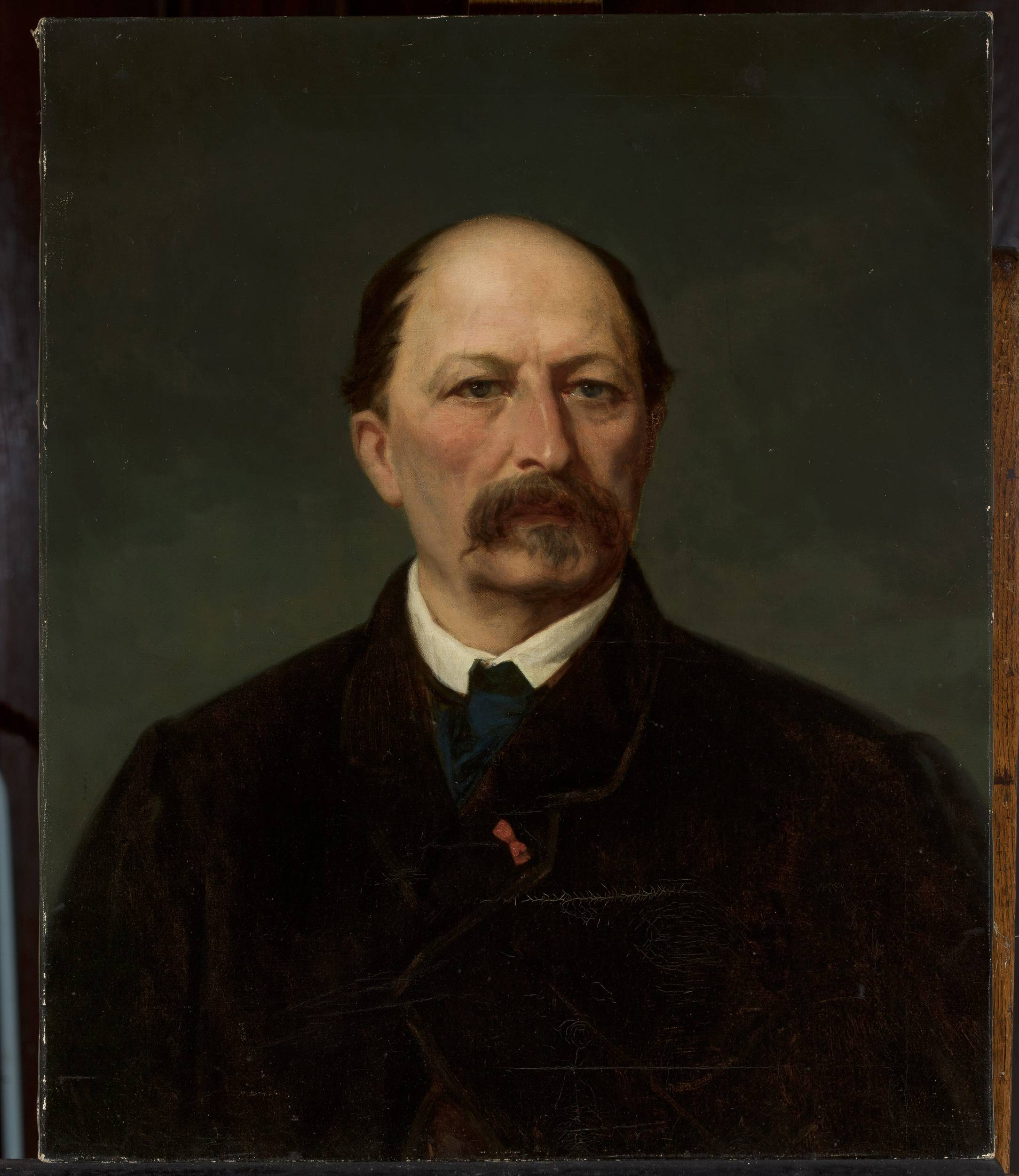
- Portrait of Ksawery Branicki by Leon Kapliński
- Born: Franciszek Ksawery Branicki; 26 October 1816; Warsaw, Congress Poland, Russian Empire
- Died: 20 November 1879 (aged 63); Assiut, Khedivate of Egypt
- Resting place: Montrésor
- Occupations: Financier, Political writer
- Era: 19th century
- Known for: Crédit Foncier de France, Philanthropy, Montrésor
- Spouse: Pelagia Zamoyska
- Children: Augustin Branicki, illegitimate but acknowledged
- Parent(s): Wladyslaw Grzegorz Branicki, Róża Potocka
- Awards: Chevalier of the Legion of Honor

Count Xavier Branicki (in Polish: Franciszek Ksawery Branicki, in French: François Xavier Branicki; 26 October 1816 – 20 November 1879) was a Polish nobleman, political exile, and landowner who took French nationality.

== Biography ==
He became a political writer, financier, art collector, and philanthropist. He was the owner and restorer of the Château de Montrésor and estate in France. He was descended from a powerful magnate family with immense land holdings in the Duchy of Lithuania and in Ukraine, partly as a result, it is said, of a family connection with Catherine the Great. He was a member of the close circle of Napoleon III. He was a co-founder of the Crédit Foncier de France, a bank that continues to this day.

== Publications ==
Branicki was the author of the following works:

- Libération de la France par un impôt sur le capital. Paris: E. Dentu. 1871. p. 31..
- L'impôt sur le capital, libérateur de la contribution de guerre – Moyens pratiques de l'appliquer. Paris: E. Dentu. 1871. p. 32..
- La politique du passé et la politique de l'avenir, esquisse d'une constitution. Paris: E. Dentu. 1876. p. 130..
- Les nationalités slaves : lettres au R. P. Gagarin. Paris: E. Dentu. 1879. p. 408. Slav..

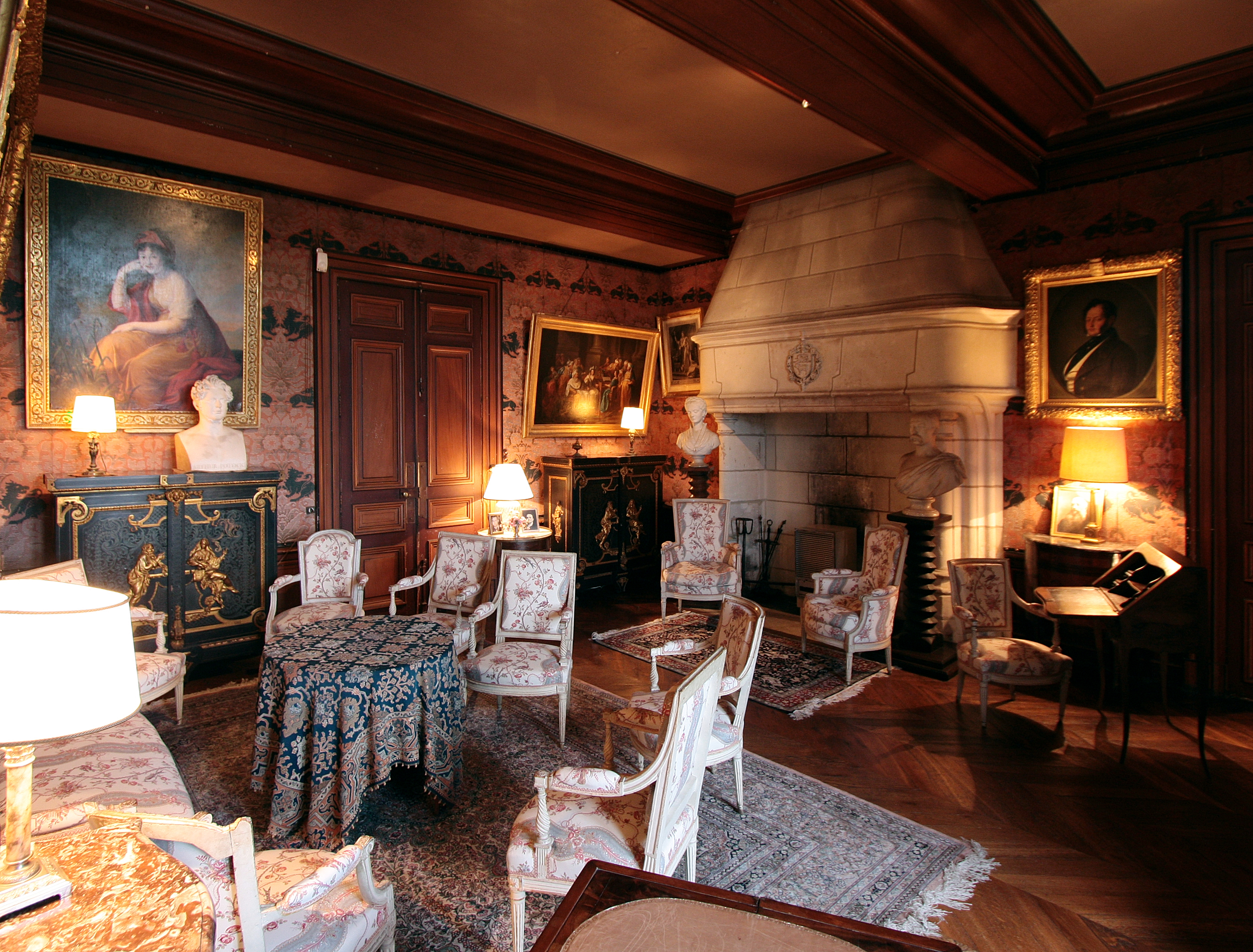
Interior of the Château de Montrésor, Branicki's decades-long restoration project

== See also ==
- List of Poles
- Louis Wolowski
