= Imbert de Batarnay =

French statesman

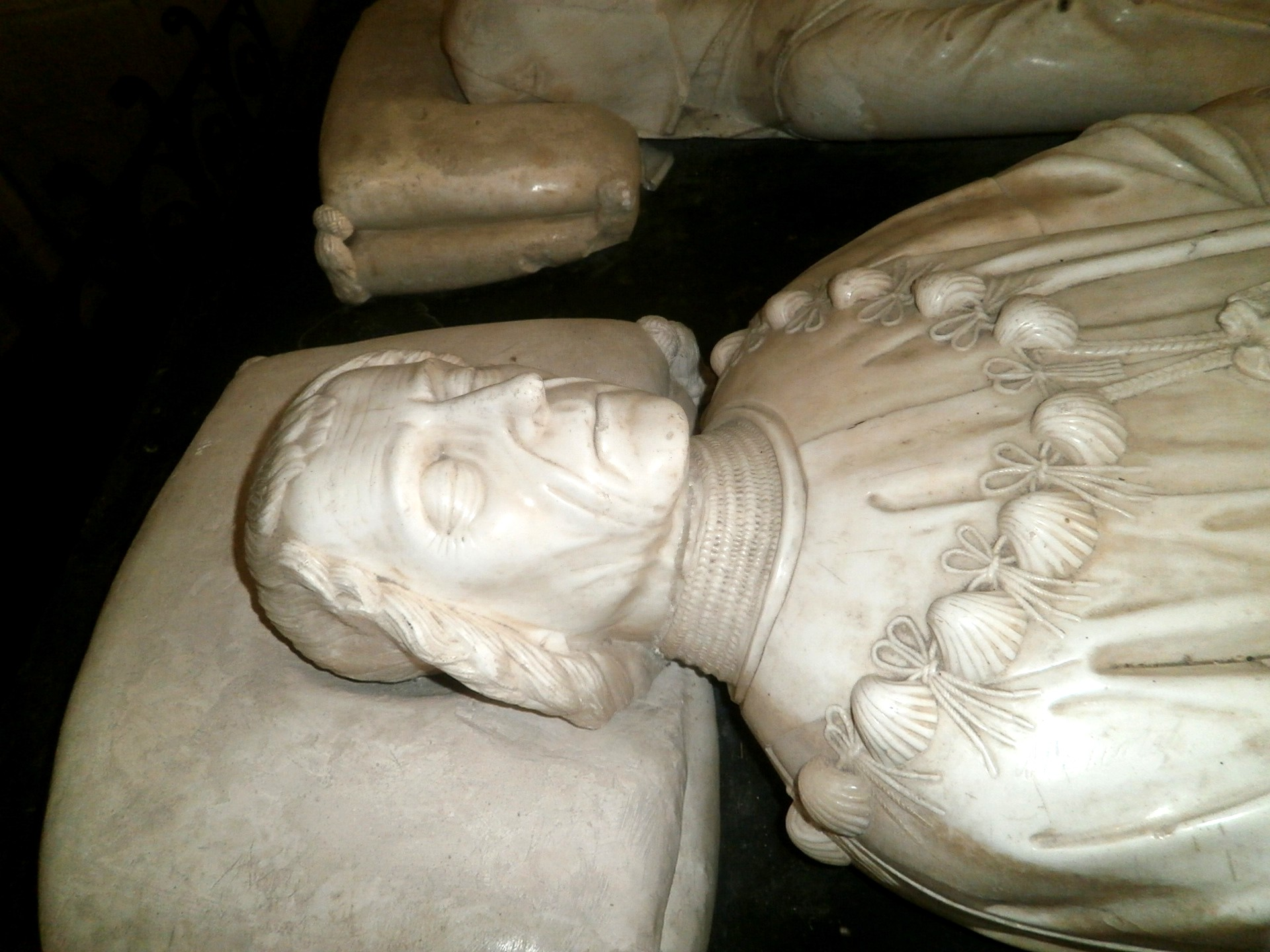
Imbert de Batarnay (lying in the collegiate church of Saint-Jean-Baptiste)

Imbert de Batarnay, Seigneur du Bouchage (1438? – 1523), French statesman, was born of an old but obscure family in Dauphiné, about the year 1438. In consequence of a chance circumstance he entered into relations with the dauphin Louis at that time (1455) in arms against the king his father; he attached himself to the prince, and followed him on his retreat into Burgundy.

From the beginning of his reign Louis XI loaded Batarnay with favors: he married him to a rich heiress, Georgette de Montchenu, lady of Le Bouchage; besides making him captain of Mont Saint-Michel and giving him valuable estates, with, later, the titles of counsellor and chamberlain to the king.

In 1469 Batarnay was sent to keep watch upon the duke of Guienne's intrigues, which began to appear dangerous. As lieutenant-general in Roussillon in 1475 he protected the countryside against the wrath of the king, who wished to repress with cruel severity a rebellion of the inhabitants. He was present at the interview between Louis XI and Edward IV of England at Picquigny, and was afterwards employed on negotiations with the duke of Burgundy.

In accordance with the recommendations of his father, Charles VIII kept the lord of Le Bouchage in his confidential service. During the differences that arose in 1485 between the regent, Anne of Beaujeu, and the dukes of Orléans, Brittany and Alençon, Imbert de Batarnay kept the inhabitants of Orléans faithful to the king. He proved his skill in the negotiations concerning the marquisate of Saluzzo and the town of Genoa.

During the Naples expedition he was in charge of the dauphin, Charles Orland, who died in 1495. He treated with Maximilian of Austria to prevent him from entering Picardy during the war with Naples, and then proceeded to Castile to claim promised support. Under Louis XII he took part in the expedition against the Genoese republic in 1507. Francis I employed him to negotiate the proposed marriage of Charles of Austria with Renée of France, daughter of Louis XII, and appointed him governor to the dauphin Francis, in 1518. He died on 12 May 1523.

== See also ==
- Saint-Jean-Baptiste de Montrésor Church
