= Montrésor =

- Commune
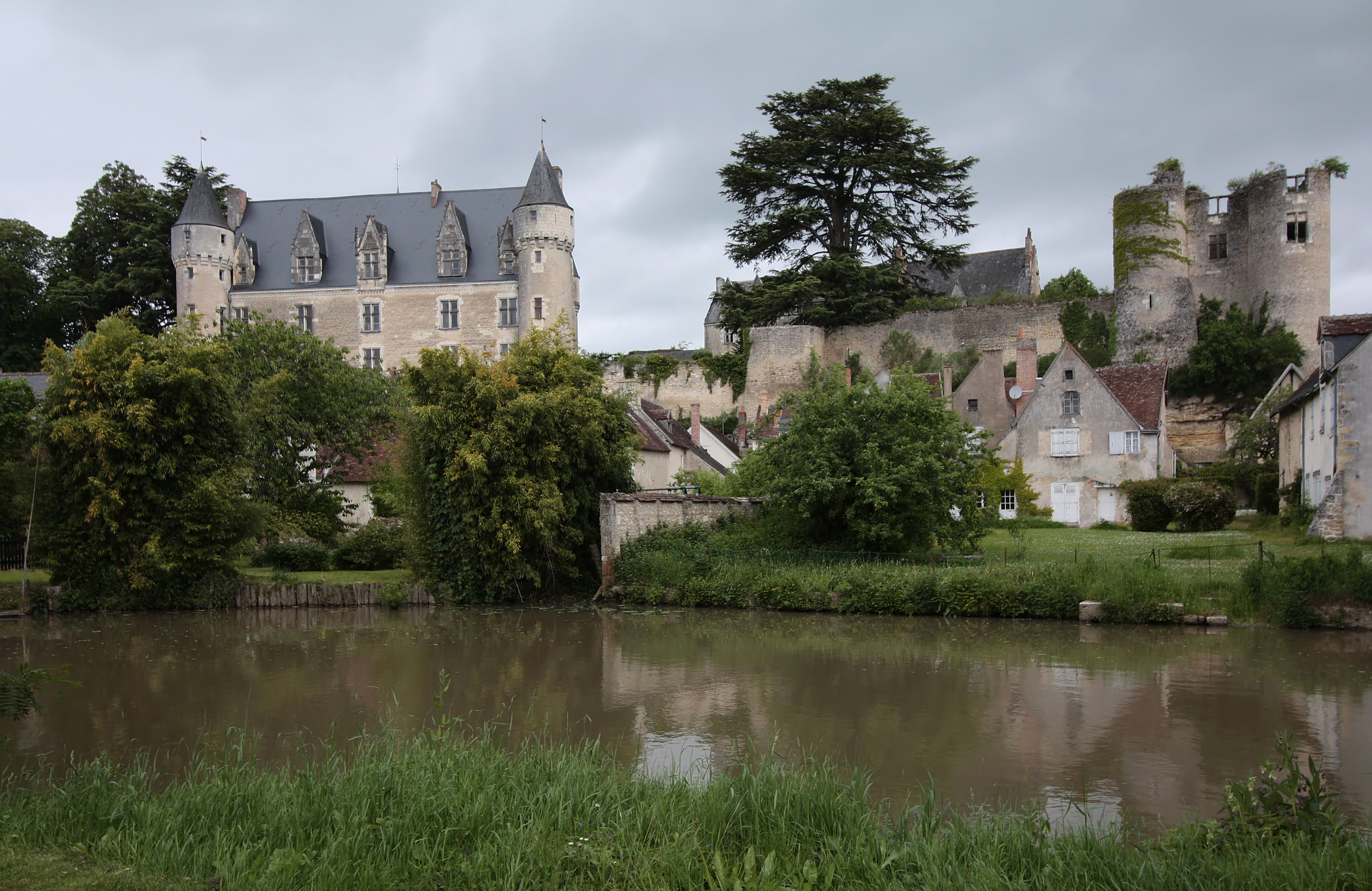
- Château de Montrésor

- Coat of arms
- Location of Montrésor
- Location within France Location within Centre-Val de Loire
- Coordinates: 47°09′24″N 1°12′06″E
- Country: France
- Region: Centre-Val de Loire
- Department: Indre-et-Loire
- Arrondissement: Loches
- Canton: Loches
- Intercommunality: CC Loches Sud Touraine

Government
  - Mayor (2020–2026): Frederic Gaultier
- Area^{1}: 0.98 km^{2} (0.38 sq mi)
- Highest elevation: 121 m (397 ft)
- Lowest elevation: 87 m (285 ft)
- Population (2023): 309
  - Density: 320/km^{2} (820/sq mi)
- Time zone: UTC+01:00 (CET)
  - Summer (DST): UTC+02:00 (CEST)
- INSEE/Postal code: 37157 /37460
- ^{1} French Land Register data, which excludes lakes, ponds, glaciers > 1 km^{2} (0.386 sq mi or 247 acres) and river estuaries.

Montrésor (French pronunciation: [mɔ̃tʁezɔʁ]) is a commune in the Indre-et-Loire department, Centre-Val de Loire, France. It is a member of Les Plus Beaux Villages de France (The Most Beautiful Villages of France) Association.

== Geography ==
The village lies on the right bank of the Indrois, which flows northwest through the middle of the commune.

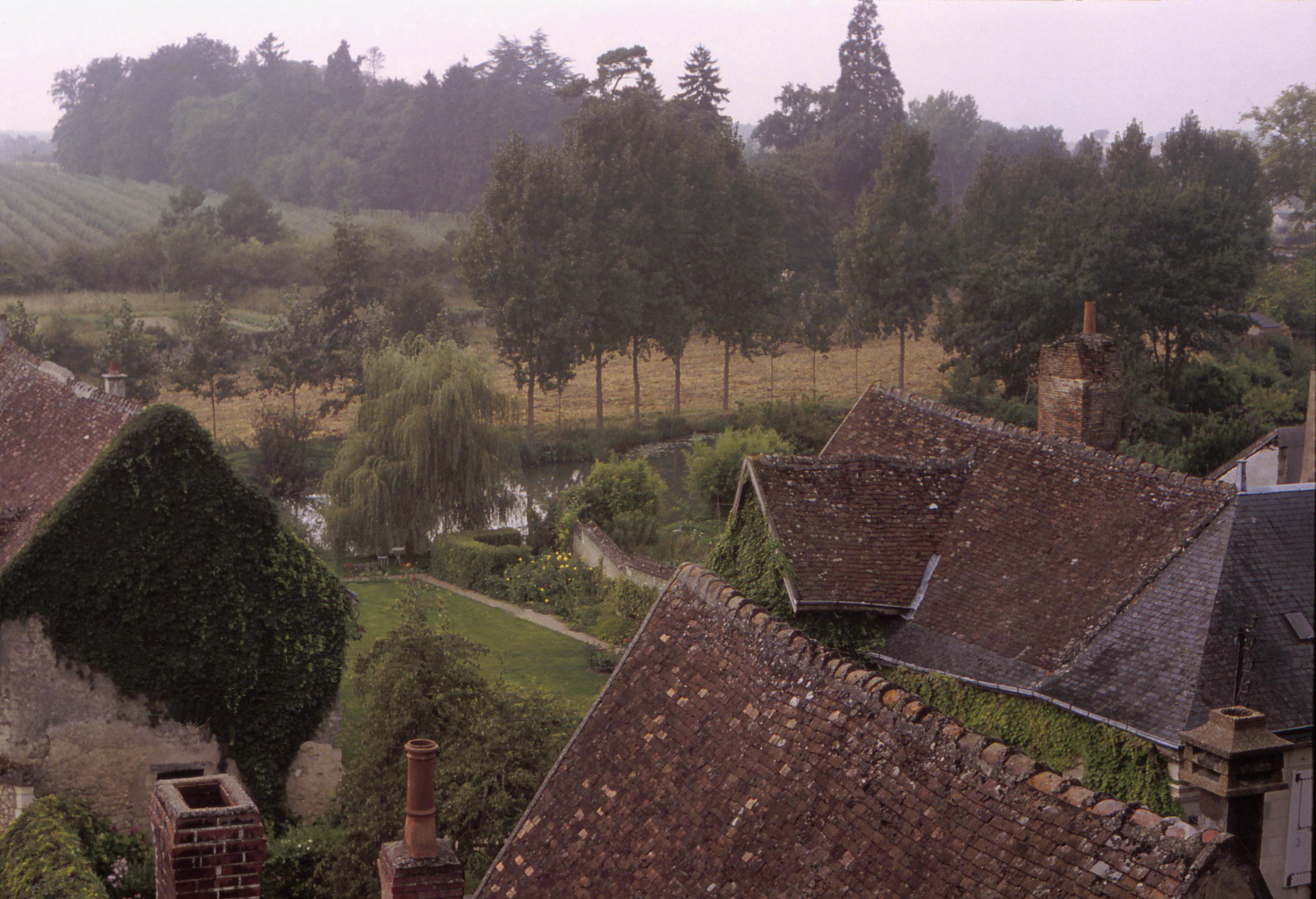
View over Montrésor, 1981

== Population ==
Historical population
Year	Pop.	±% p.a.
1968	512	—
1975	465	−1.37%
1982	460	−0.15%
1990	362	−2.95%
1999	395	+0.97%
2007	363	−1.05%
2012	341	−1.24%
2017	341	+0.00%
2023	309	−1.63%
Source: INSEE

== See also ==
- Communes of the Indre-et-Loire department
- Saint-Jean-Baptiste de Montrésor Church
