= Château d'Azay-le-Rideau =

French château

Coordinates: 47°15′36″N 0°28′0.9″E

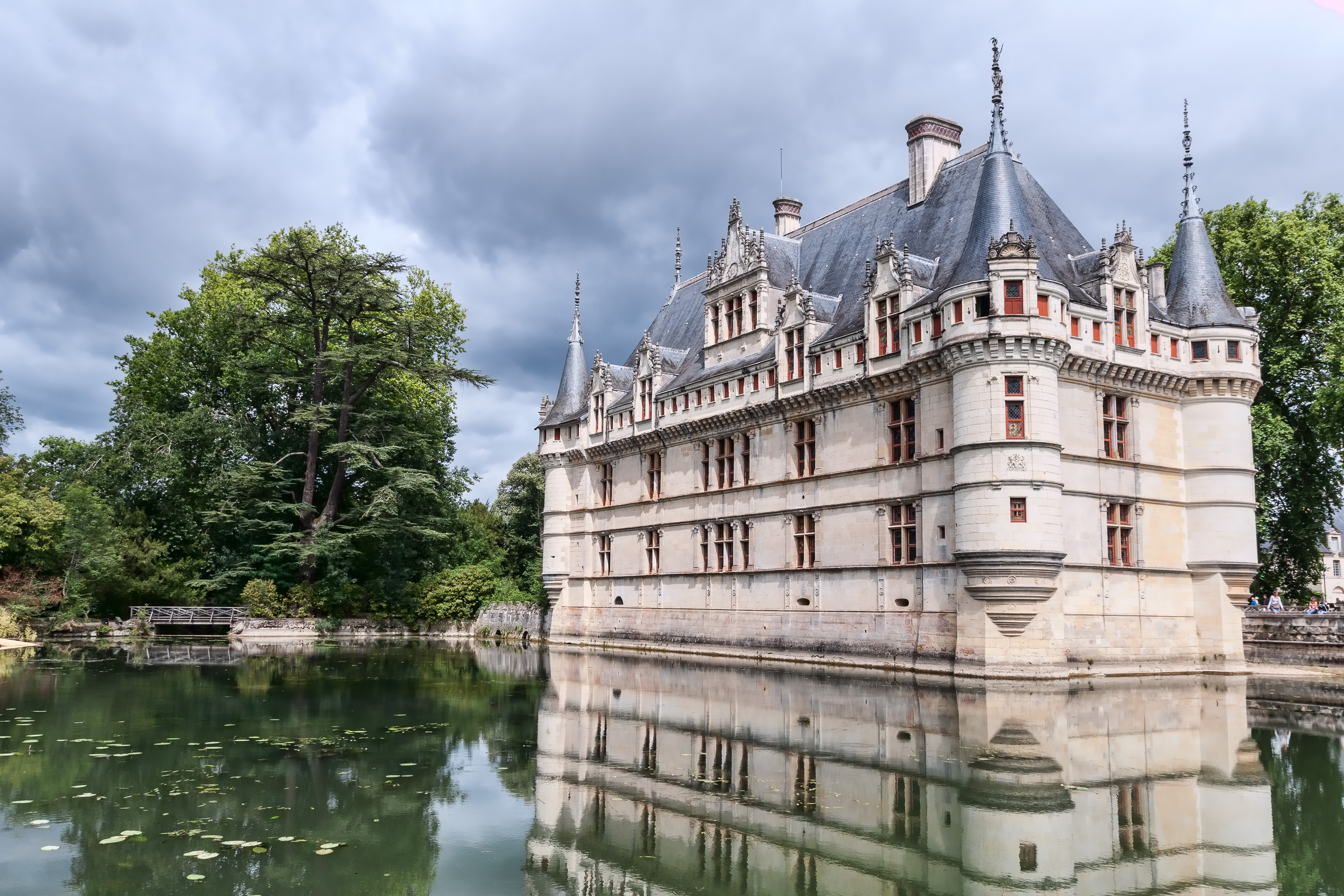
The Château and surrounding water

The Château d'Azay-le-Rideau (pronounced [azɛ lə ʁido]) is located in the town of Azay-le-Rideau in the French département of Indre-et-Loire. Built between 1518 and 1527, this château is considered one of the foremost examples of early French renaissance architecture. Set on an island in the middle of the Indre river, this picturesque château has become one of the most popular of the châteaux of the Loire valley.

== History ==
=== Origins of the Château ===
The current château of Azay-le-Rideau occupies the site of a former feudal castle. During the 12th century, the local seigneur Ridel (or Rideau) d'Azay, a knight in the service of Philip II Augustus, built a fortress here to protect the Tours to Chinon road where it crossed the river Indre.

However, this original medieval castle fell victim to the rivalry between Burgundian and Armagnac factions during the Hundred Years' War. In 1418, the future Charles VII passed through Azay-le-Rideau as he fled from Burgundian occupied Paris to the loyal Armagnac stronghold of Bourges. Angered by the insults of the Burgundian troops occupying the town, the dauphin ordered his own army to storm the castle. The 350 soldiers inside were all executed, and the castle itself burnt to the ground. For centuries, this fate was commemorated in the town's name of Azay-le-Brûlé (literally Azay the Burnt), which remained in use until the 18th century.

=== The Berthelots and the 16th century ===
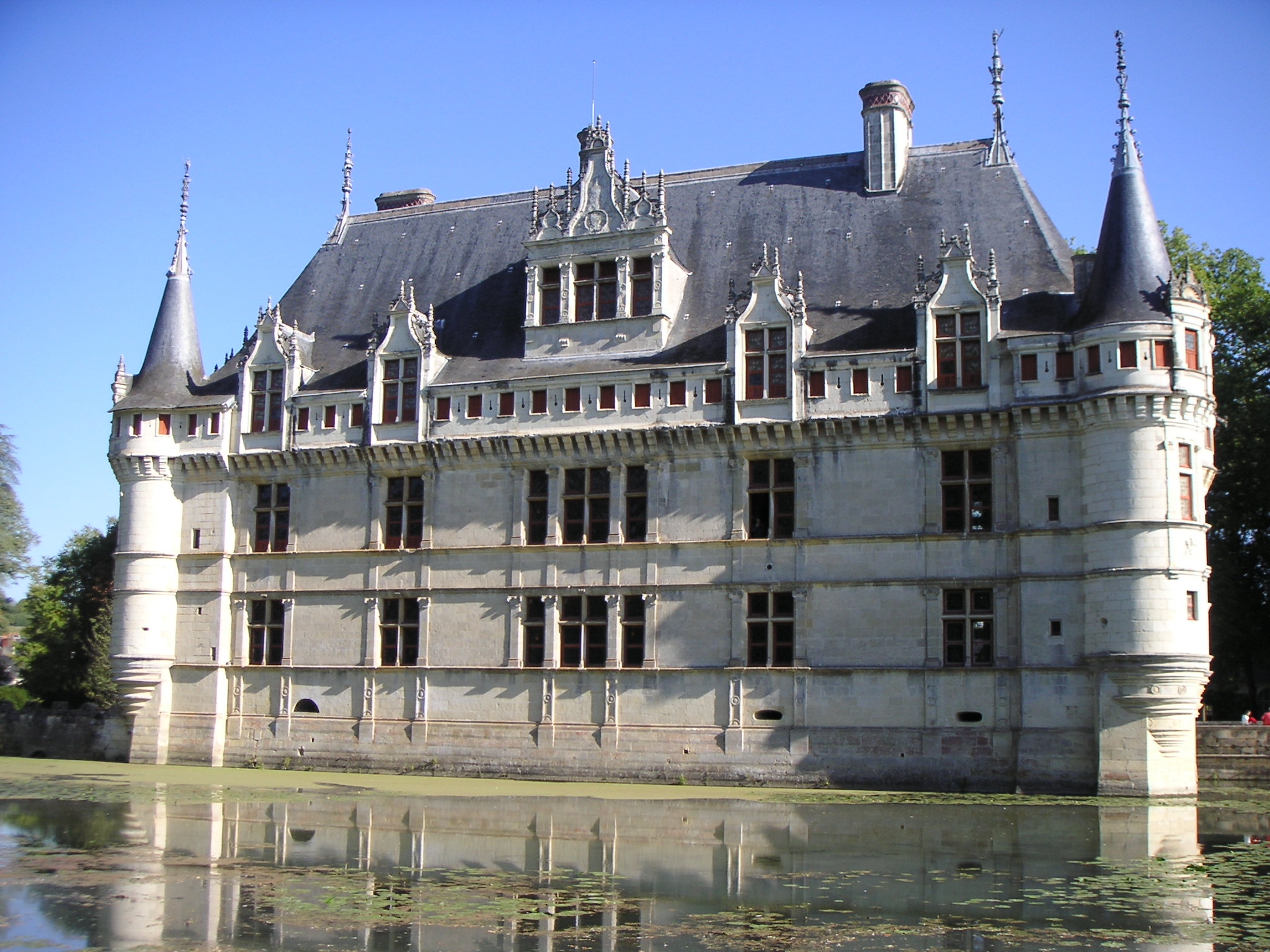
View of the façade from the southern side

The castle remained in ruins until 1518, when the land was acquired by Gilles Berthelot, the Mayor of Tours and Treasurer-General of the King's finances. Desiring a residence to reflect his wealth and status, Berthelot set about reconstructing the building in a way that would incorporate its medieval past alongside the latest architectural styles of the Italian Renaissance. Although the château's purpose was to be largely residential, defensive fortifications remained important symbols of prestige, and so Berthelot was keen to have them for his new castle. He justified his request to the King, Francis I, by an exaggerated description of the many 'public thieves, footpads and other vagabonds, evildoers committing affray, disputes, thefts, larcenies, outrages, extortions and sundry other evils' which threatened unfortified towns such as Azay-le-Rideau.

Berthelot's duties meant that he was frequently absent from the château, so the responsibility for supervising the building works fell to his wife, Philippa Lesbahy. These took time, since it was difficult to lay solid foundations in the damp ground of this island in the Indre, and the château had to be raised on stilts driven into the mud. Even once the foundations were laid, construction still progressed slowly, as much of the stone for the château came from the Saint-Aignan quarry, which was famous for its hard-wearing rock but was also around 100 km (62 mi) away, meaning that the heavy blocks had to be transported to Azay-le-Rideau by boat.

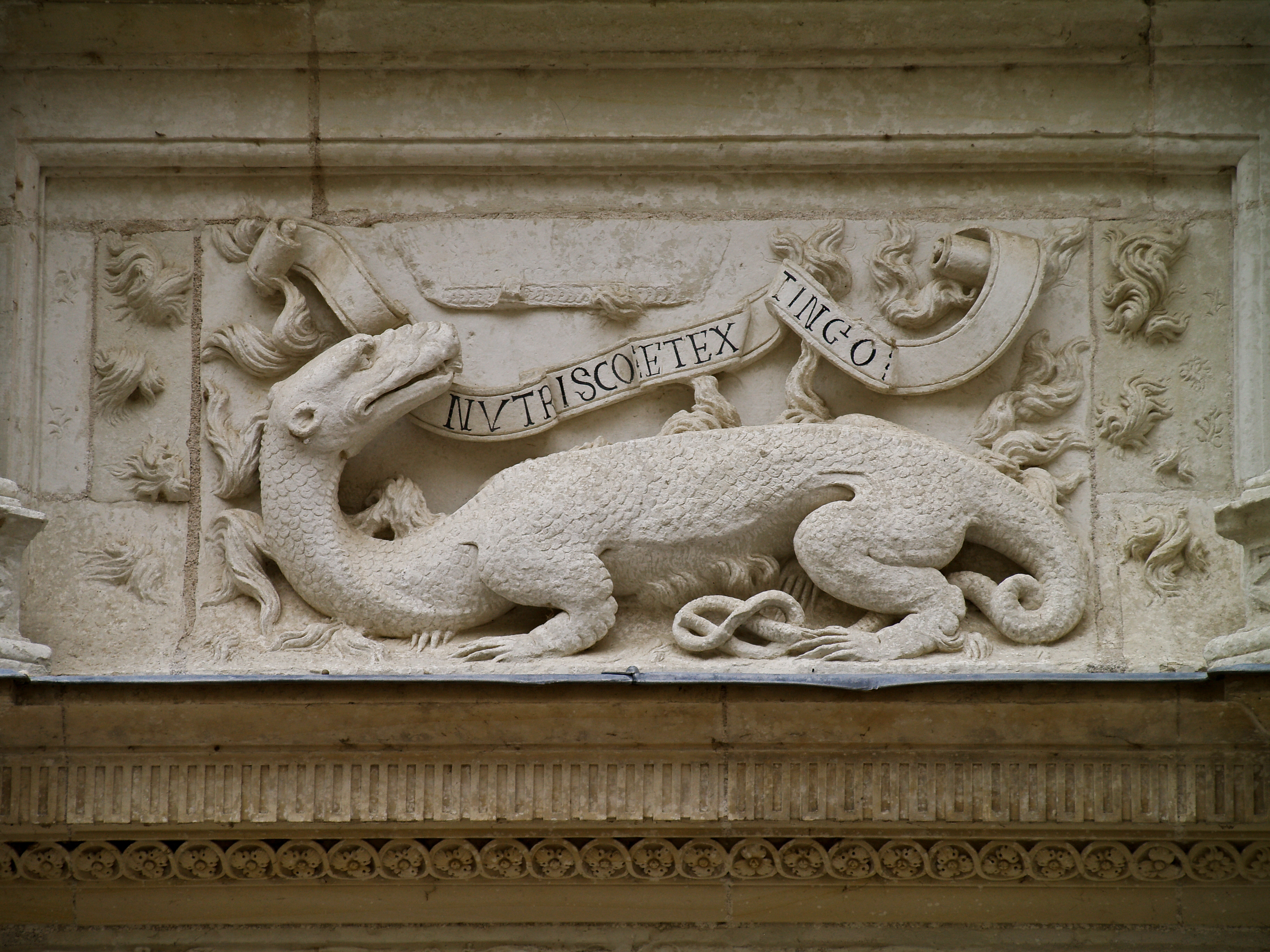
Salamander of Francis I with his device, Nutrisco et extinguo, from the pediment at Azay

The château was still incomplete in 1527, when the execution of Jacques de Beaune, (the chief minister in charge of royal finances and cousin to Berthelot) forced Gilles to flee the country. Possibly fearing the exposure of his own financial misdemeanours, he went into exile first in Metz in Lorraine, and later in Cambrai, where he died just two years later. Disregarding the pleas of Berthelot's wife Philippa, Francis I confiscated the unfinished château and, in 1535, gave it to Antoine Raffin, one of his knights-at-arms. Raffin undertook only minor renovations in the château, and so the building works remained incomplete, with only the south and west wings of the planned quadrilateral ever being built. Thus, the château preserved the distinctive, but accidental, L-shape which it retains to this day.

=== 17th–18th centuries ===
In 1583, Raffin's granddaughter Antoinette, a former lady-in-waiting to Margaret of Valois, took up residence in the château and, with the help of her husband the seigneur de Lanssac, began modernising the décor. Azay-le-Rideau was then inherited by their son Arthur and his wife Françoise de Souvre, a future governess to Louis XIV, and it was during their ownership that the new château received its first royal visit: on 27 June 1619, while on his way from Paris to visit his mother, Marie de' Medici, in Blois, Louis XIII broke his journey to spend the night in Azay-le-Rideau. Later in the century, his son Louis XIV would also be a guest in the same room.

=== The Biencourts and the 19th century ===
The Raffins, and their relations by marriage, the Vassés, retained ownership of the château until 1787, when it was sold for 300,000 livres to the Marquis Charles de Biencourt, field marshal of the king's armies. The château was in poor condition, though, and from the 1820s, Biencourt undertook extensive alteration work. In 1824, he added a 'Chinese room' (destroyed in the 1860s) to the ground floor in the south wing, and in 1825 or 1826 decorated the library with carved wood panelling to match the drawing room on the opposite side.

It was his son, Armand-François-Marie, a guard of Louis XVI who participated in the defence of the Tuileries on 10 August 1792, who began the first extensive restoration of the château. This included restoring the old medallions and royal insignia on the staircase (which had been covered up during the Revolution), extending the courtyard façade and adding a new tower at the east corner. These developments destroyed the last vestiges of the old medieval fortress and meant that the château at last achieved a finished appearance. For these renovations, he employed the Swiss architect Pierre-Charles Dusillon, who was also working on the neighbouring château of Ussé.

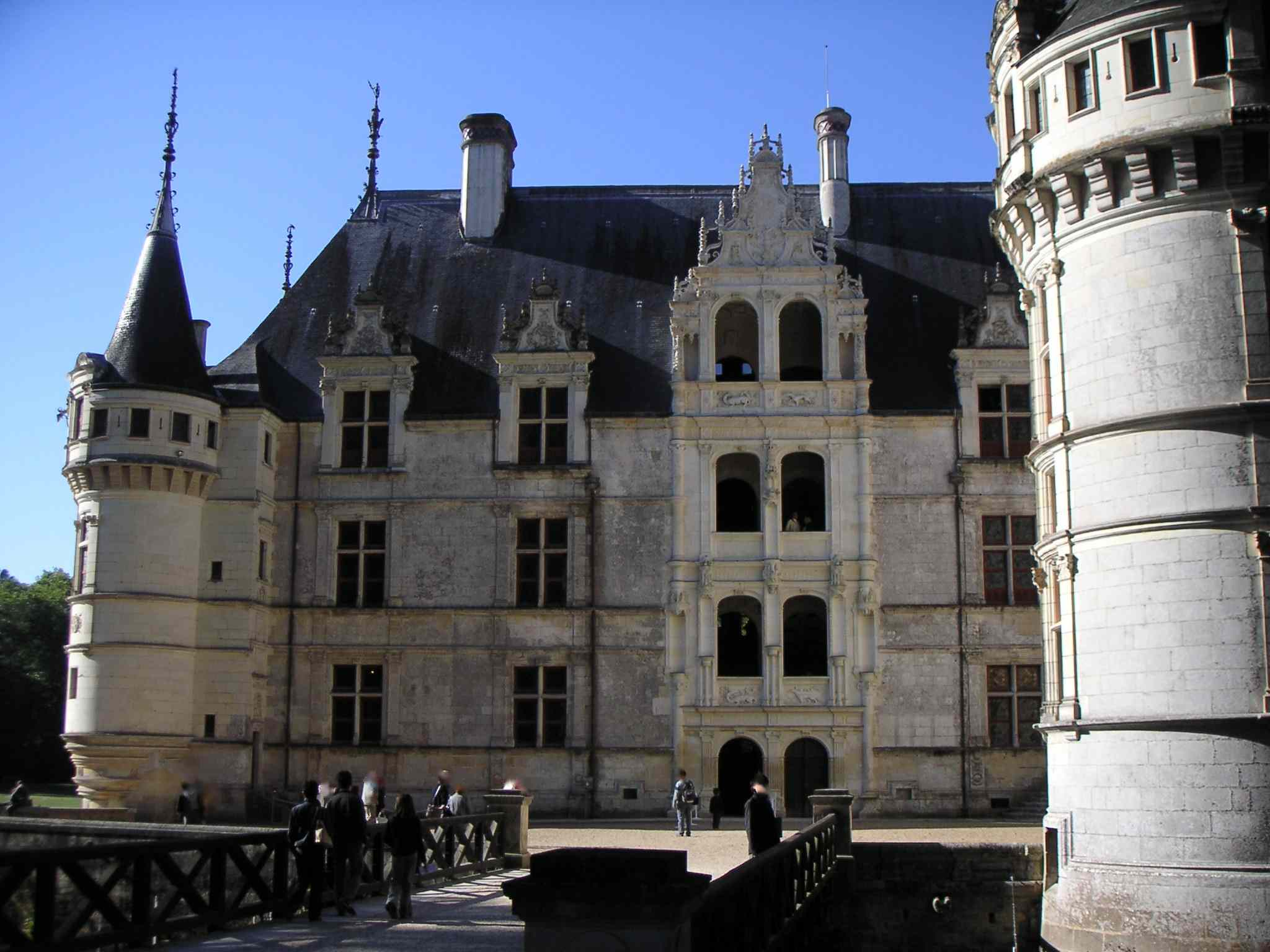
View of the internal courtyard

During the Franco-Prussian War, the château was once again threatened with destruction. It served as the headquarters for the Prussian troops in the area, but when one night a chandelier fell from the ceiling onto the table where their leader, Prince Friedrich Karl of Prussia, was dining, he suspected an assassination attempt and ordered his soldiers to set fire to the building. Only his officers' assurances that the lamp had dropped by accident persuaded him to stay his hand and thus saved the château from a second burning.

Following the Prussian troops' retreat, Azay-le-Rideau returned to the Biencourts. In this period, the château became well known for the collection of more than 300 historical portraits which the owners displayed there and which, unusually for a private collection, could be visited by the public. In 1899, financial difficulties forced the young widower Charles-Marie-Christian de Biencourt to sell the château, along with its furniture and 540 hectares of land, to the businessman Achille Arteau, a former lawyer from Tours who wanted to sell its contents for profit. As a result, the château was emptied and its artwork and furniture dispersed.

=== The Château in the 20th century ===
In 1905, the estate was purchased by the French state for 250,000 francs and became a listed Historical Monument. During the early years of the Second World War, 1939–1940, the château provided a home for the Education Ministry when they, like many other French ministries, withdrew from Paris. The château d'Azay-le-Rideau is now one of many national monuments under the protection of the Centre des monuments nationaux, and also forms part of the Loire valley UNESCO World Heritage Site.

== Architecture and decoration ==
=== Exterior ===
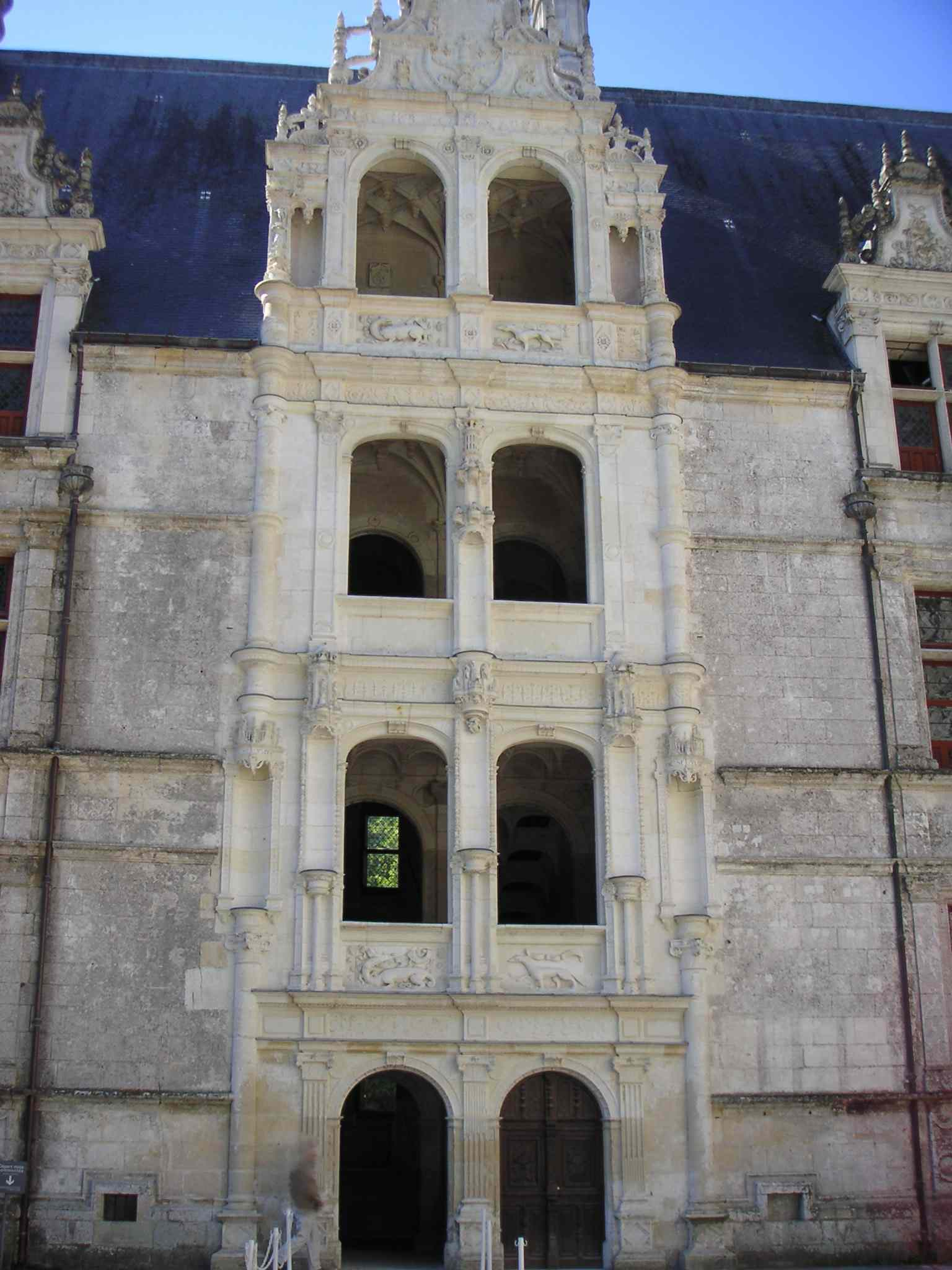
View of the escalier d'honneur from the inner courtyard, Azay-le-Rideau

Set on an island in the middle of the Indre, the château of Azay-le-Rideau seems to rise straight out of the waters of the river, which reflect the castle's façades so that the château appears to float in its own image. The writer Balzac, who lived nearby and was occasionally a guest at the château, deeply admired the building, describing it as 'a faceted diamond, set in the Indre'. This striking setting has helped Azay-le-Rideau to become one of the most famous of the Loire's many châteaux.

This relatively small château is divided into two sections, the main central body and a wing at right angles to it, and displays a blend of architectural styles. The influence of the fashionable Italian Renaissance style is clear in its long proportions and ornate sculptural decorations. Alongside these Italianate elements are vestiges of medieval defensive architecture, such as the traces of the covered walkway on the external walls or the machicolations under the roof, which were no longer necessary for defence but were incorporated in the château's design because of their symbolic prestige. Finally, other architectural features, such as the bastion corners with their pointed conical turrets, the vertically stacked dormer windows separated by a string course, and the high, steeply sloping slate roof, help to give Azay-le-Rideau its unmistakably French appearance.

The château's most prominent feature is the grand central staircase, the escalier d'honneur. Its design is thought to have been inspired by the staircase of the Château de Châteaudun, which it resembles from the outside, though its internal structure is very different. Azay-le-Rideau's staircase rises in straight flights rather than in a spiral, as was more usual at this time, and is the oldest surviving staircase of this kind in France.

The staircase has three floors, each with a double bay window forming a mezzanine which looks out over the courtyard. The entryway, which resembles a Roman triumphal arch, is decorated with the initials of Gilles Berthelot and his wife, while the pediments overhanging each window bay are carved with the salamander and ermine of Francis I and his wife, Claude of France, in honour to the monarch of the time. Inside, the ceiling of the staircase is made up of medallions sculpted with the profiles of the kings and queens of France from Louis XI to Henry IV. With its columns and pilasters, and ornate carvings of shells, medallions and other symbols, this impressive staircase provides a clear example of the influence of Italian renaissance style in the château's design.

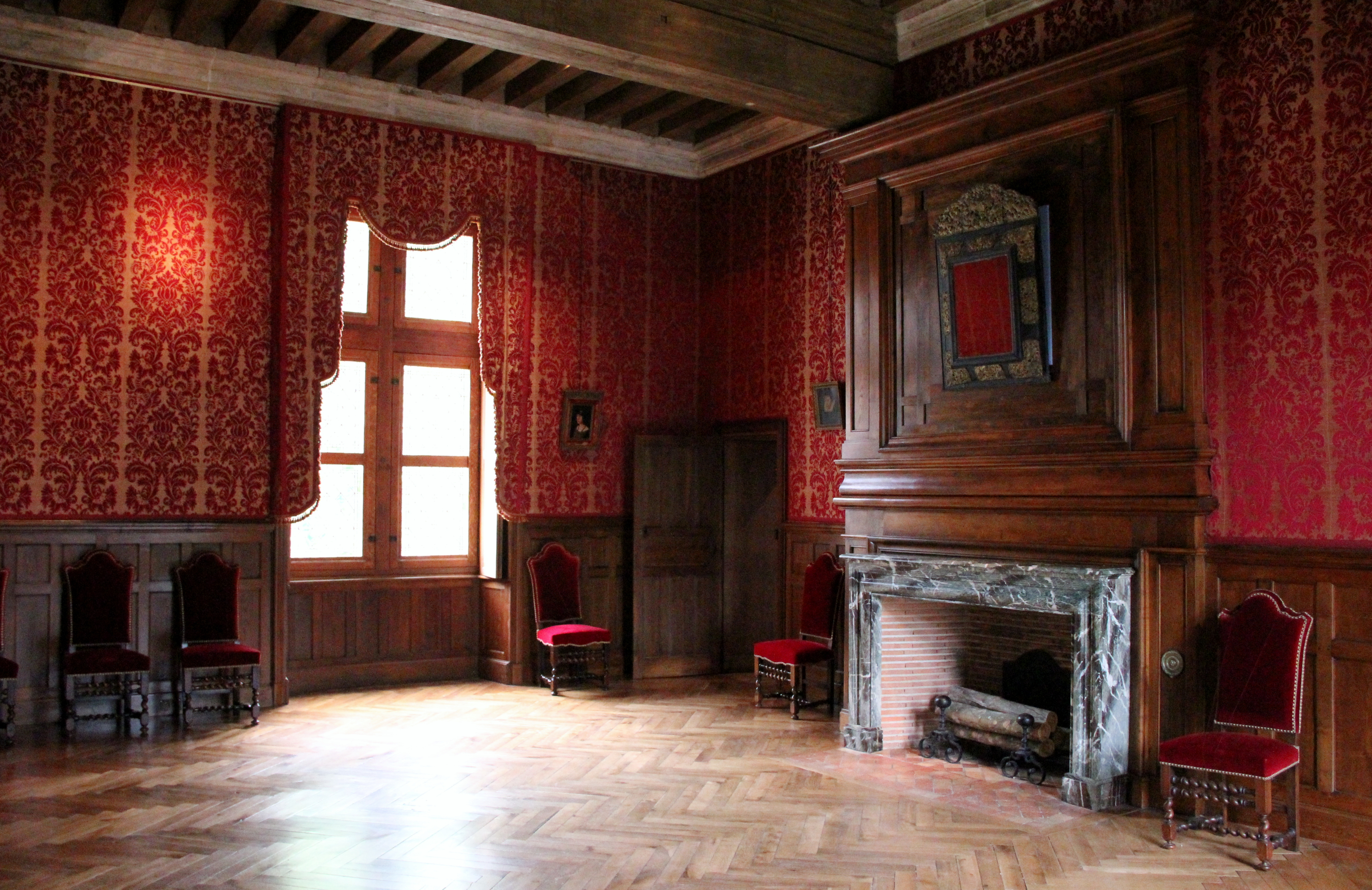
Interior decoration

=== Interior ===
The château's richly sculpted interior decoration once again reflects the influence of the Italian Renaissance. It is made up of several drawing rooms and stately apartments, most of which are decorated in the neo-renaissance style popular during the 19th century. Many of these rooms display 16th- and 17th-century Flemish tapestries, most notably the 'Scenes from the Old Testament' woven in Audenarde, and the 'Story of Psyche', which was created in Brussels and which, in 2009, provided the inspiration for the château's exhibition dedicated to the Greek myth. The château also houses a significant collection of artwork, including a 'Dame au Bain' (possibly depicting Diane de Poitiers) by François Clouet, and several portraits of French monarchs, including Francis I, Henry III and Catherine de' Medici.

Also of note are the attics, where the charpente (in French), or the hand-crafted wooden frame supporting the roof, has been recently restored (2010–11) and can be viewed alongside an exhibition explaining the complex techniques of its construction.

== Park and gardens ==
The current gardens were designed in the 19th century by the Biencourts, who created a large landscaped park in the English style. To the south and west, the river creates a water mirror for the château, reflecting the façades and creating an attractive tableau.

== Gallery ==
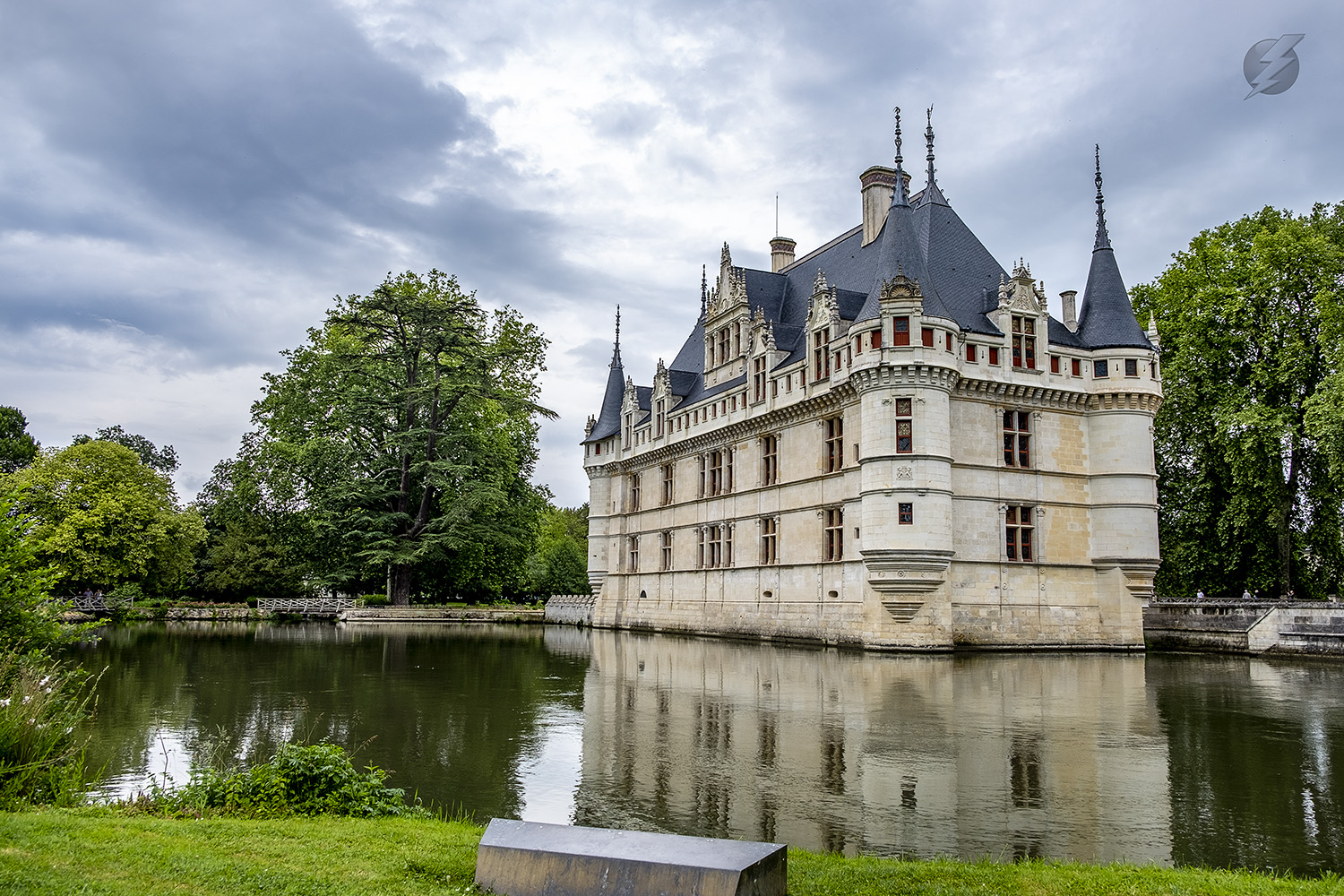
The chateau of Azay Le Rideau is built on an island in the River Indre near the Loire in France

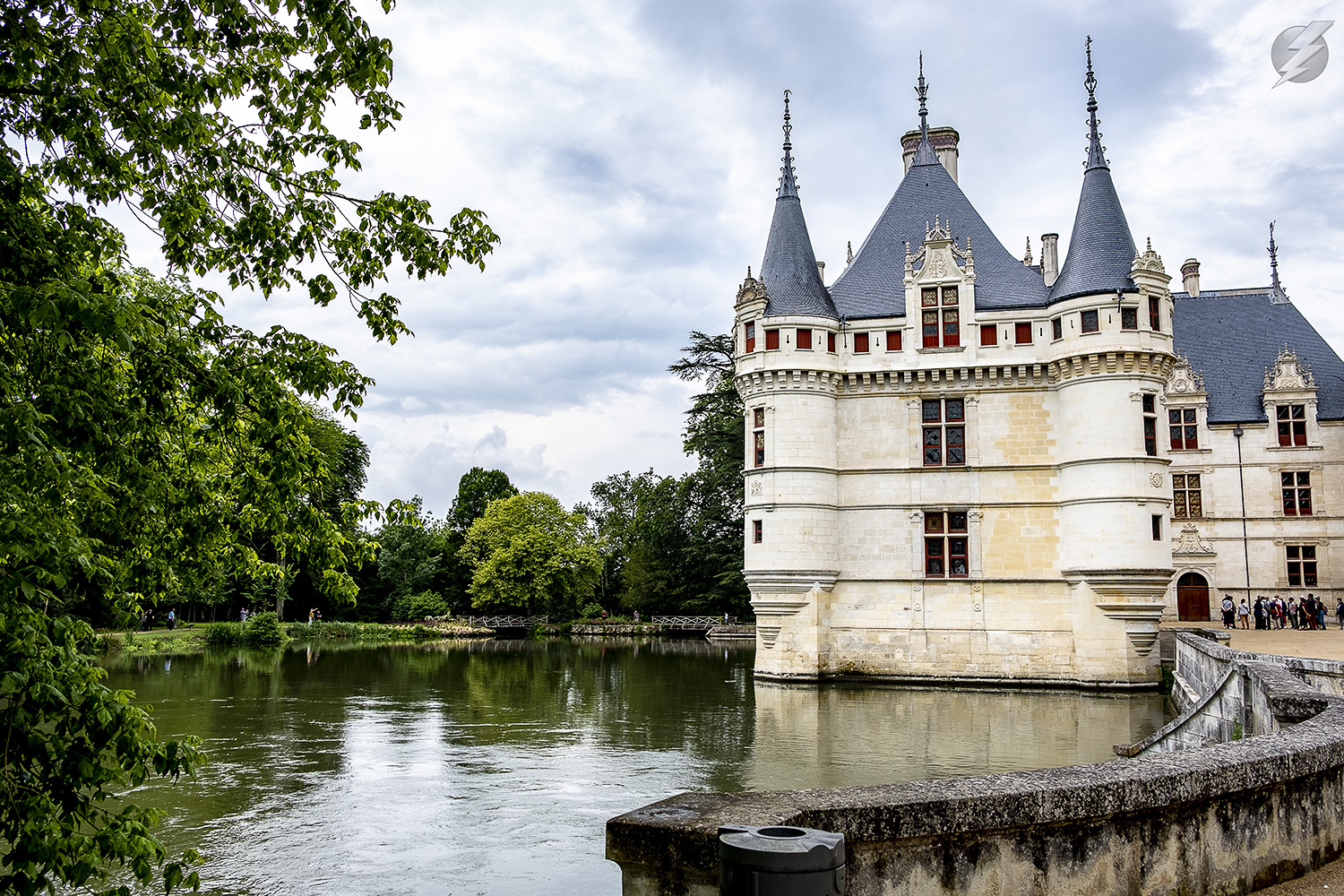
The site of the chateau was originally occupied by a medieval fortress

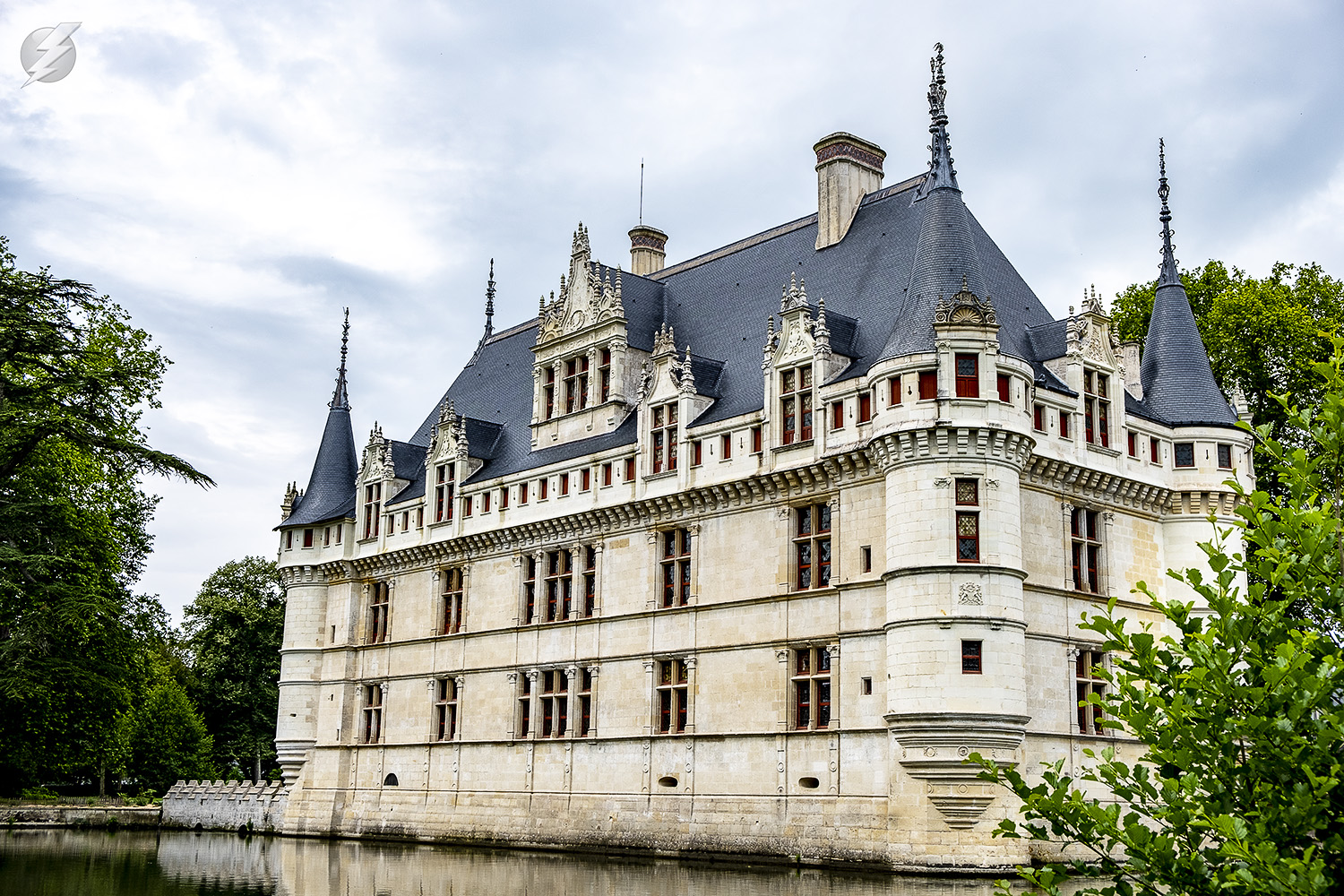
The chateau at Azay le Rideau is not the largest in the Loire region but is probably the most elegant.

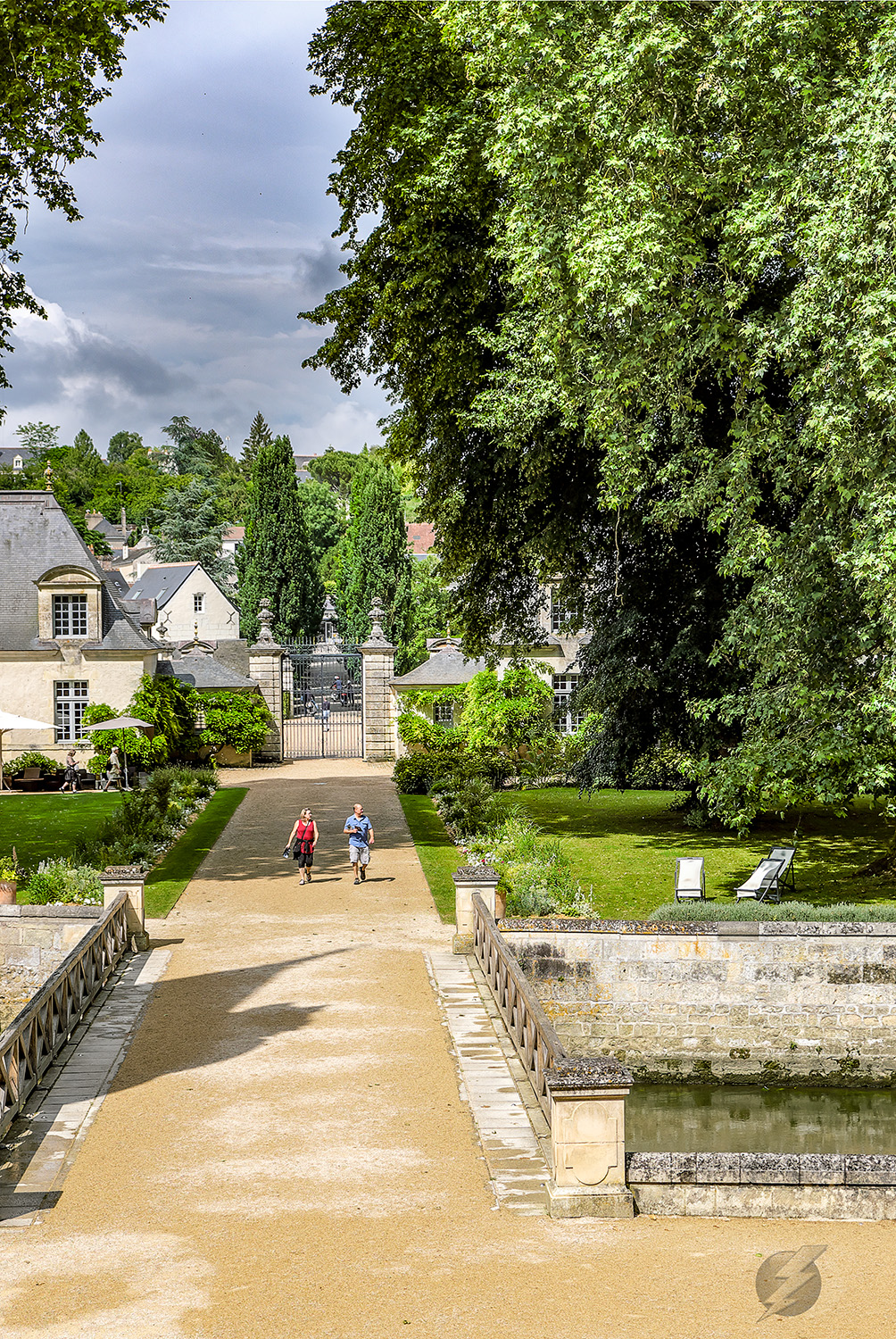
The trees is the gardens of the chateau are impressive. Compare the size of the people to that of the trees

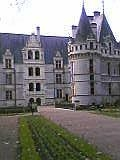
The entrance of the château

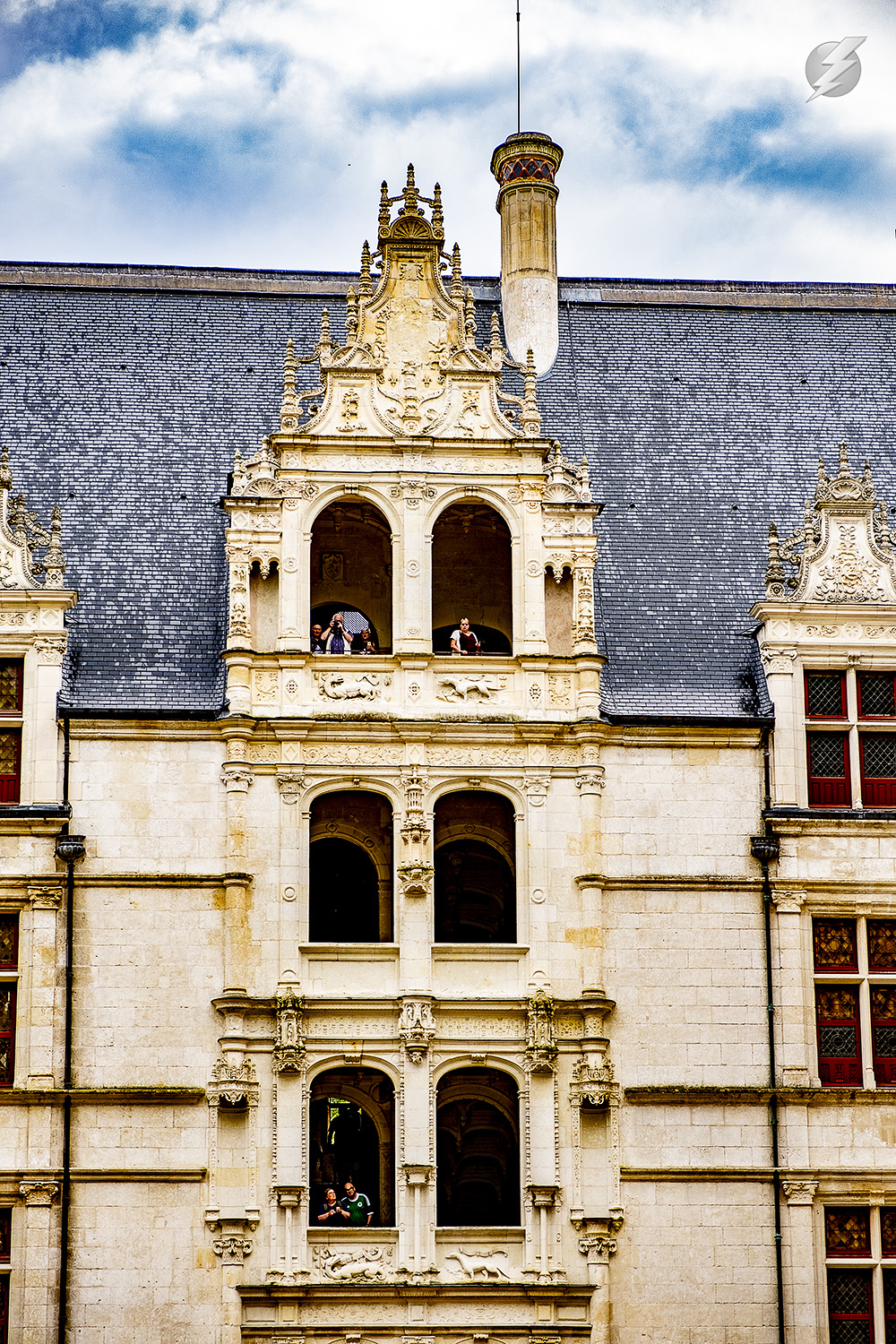
The main staircase as seen from the courtyard

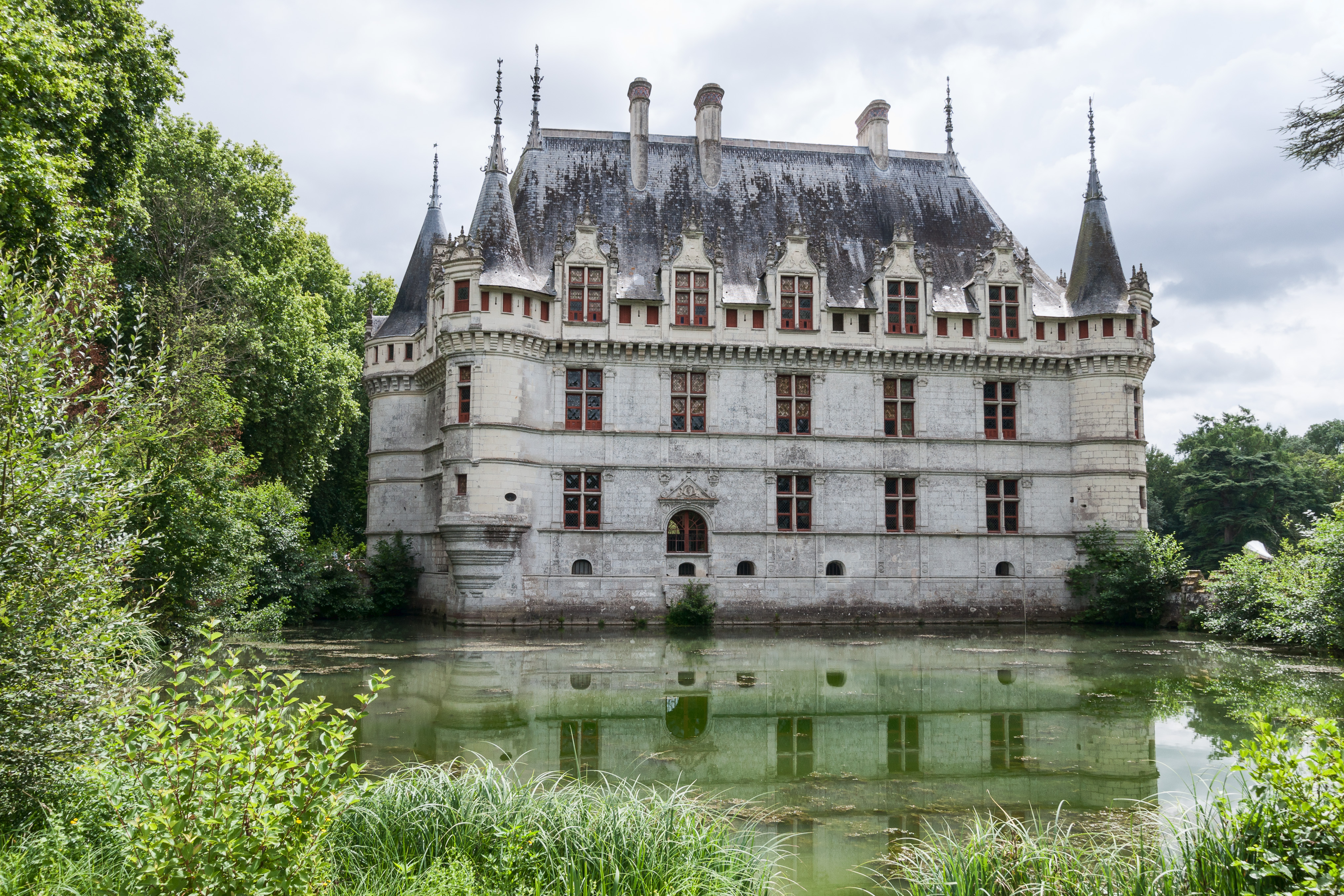
The west wing

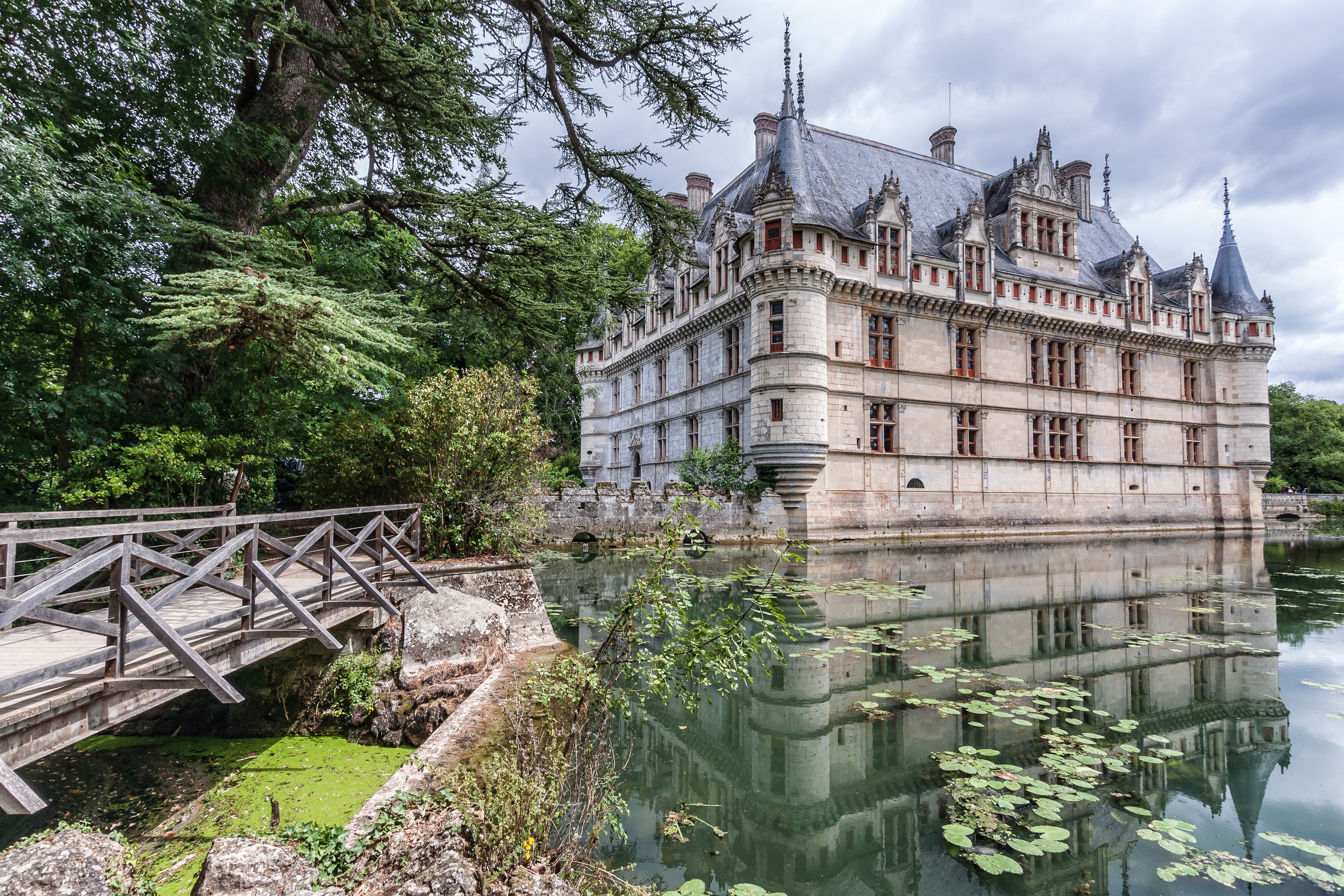
View of the château from the gardens

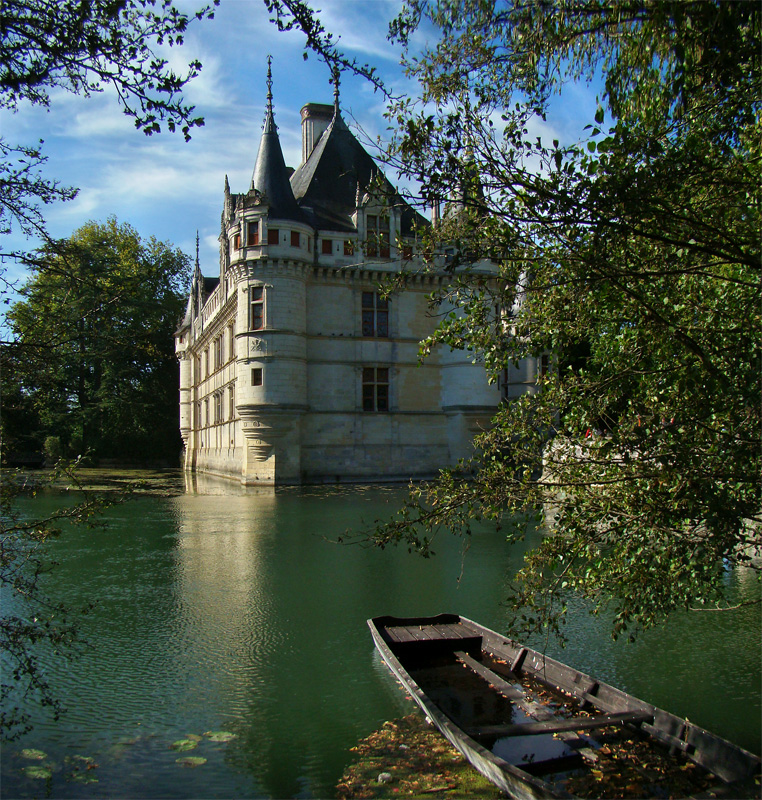
The château and its moat

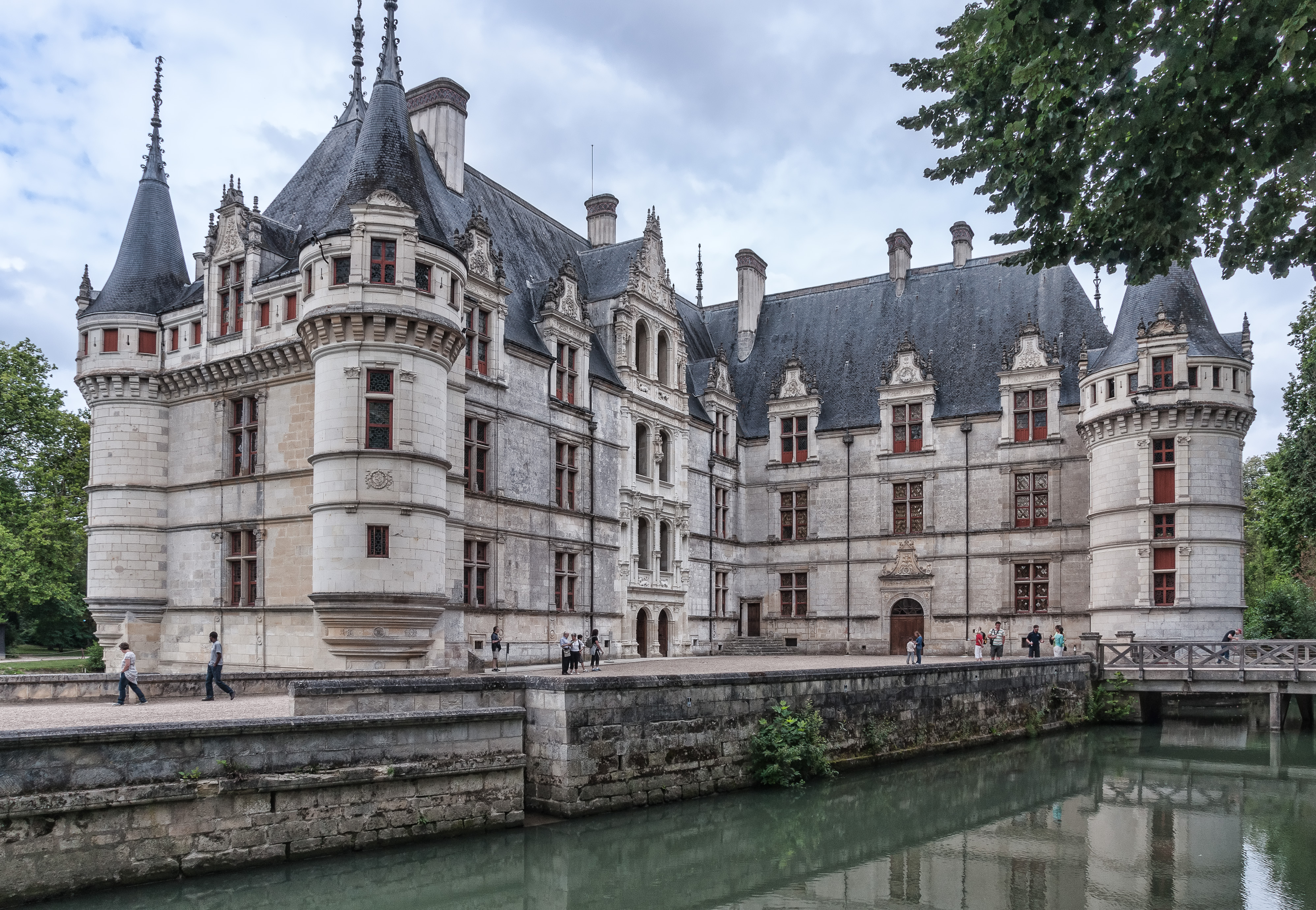
Interior courtyard

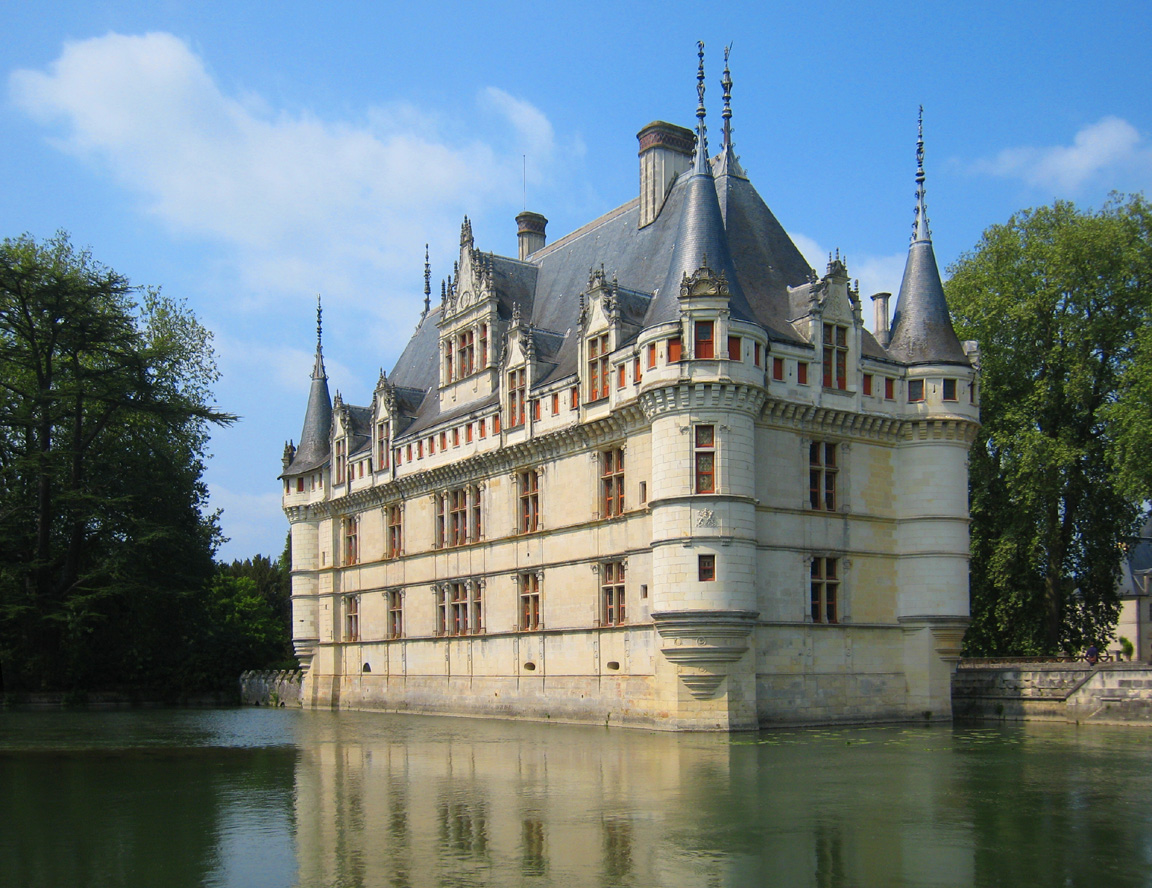
View of the château and surrounding water

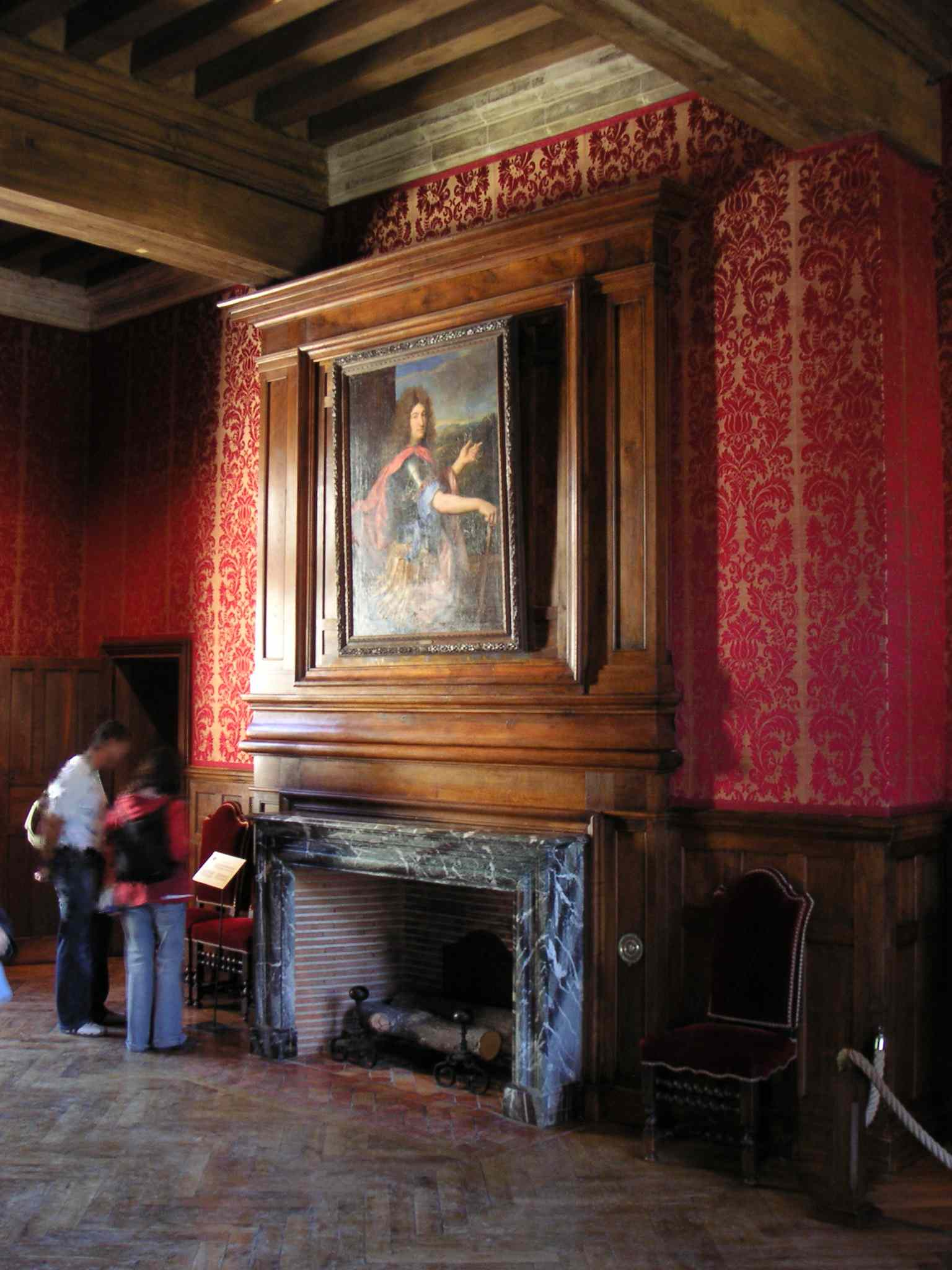
First floor bedroom

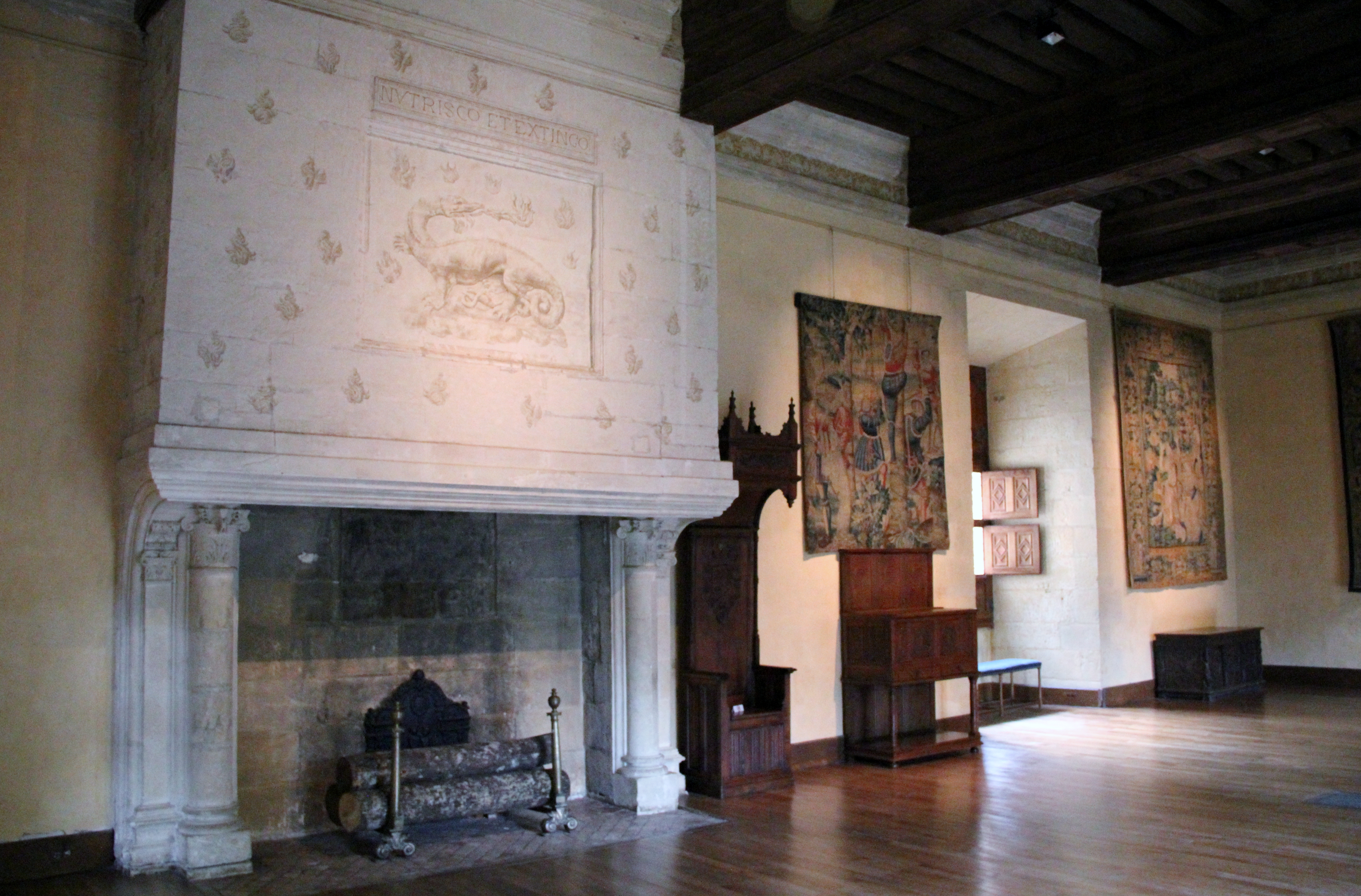
Chimneybreast showing Francis I's salamander

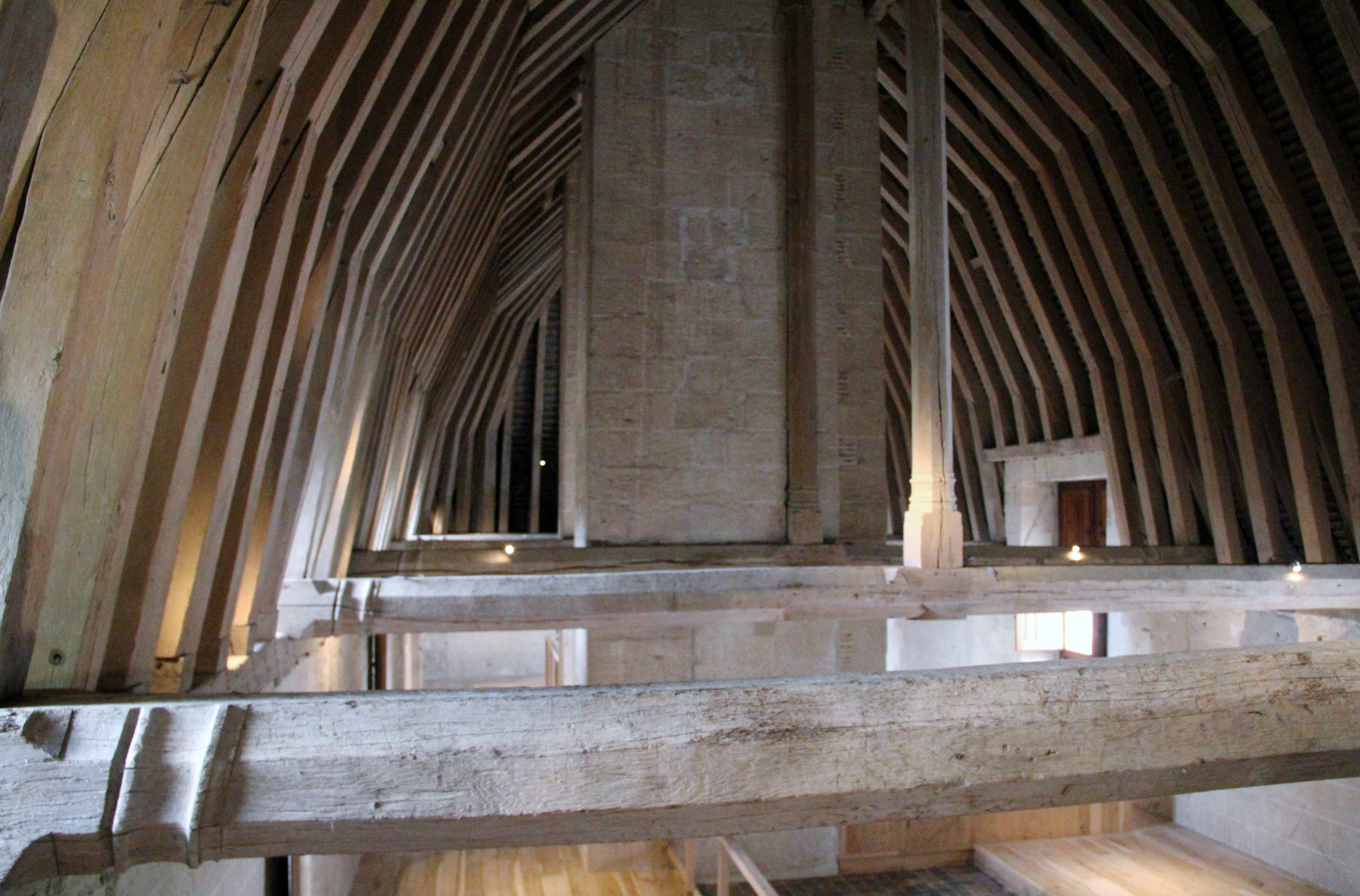
Carpentry

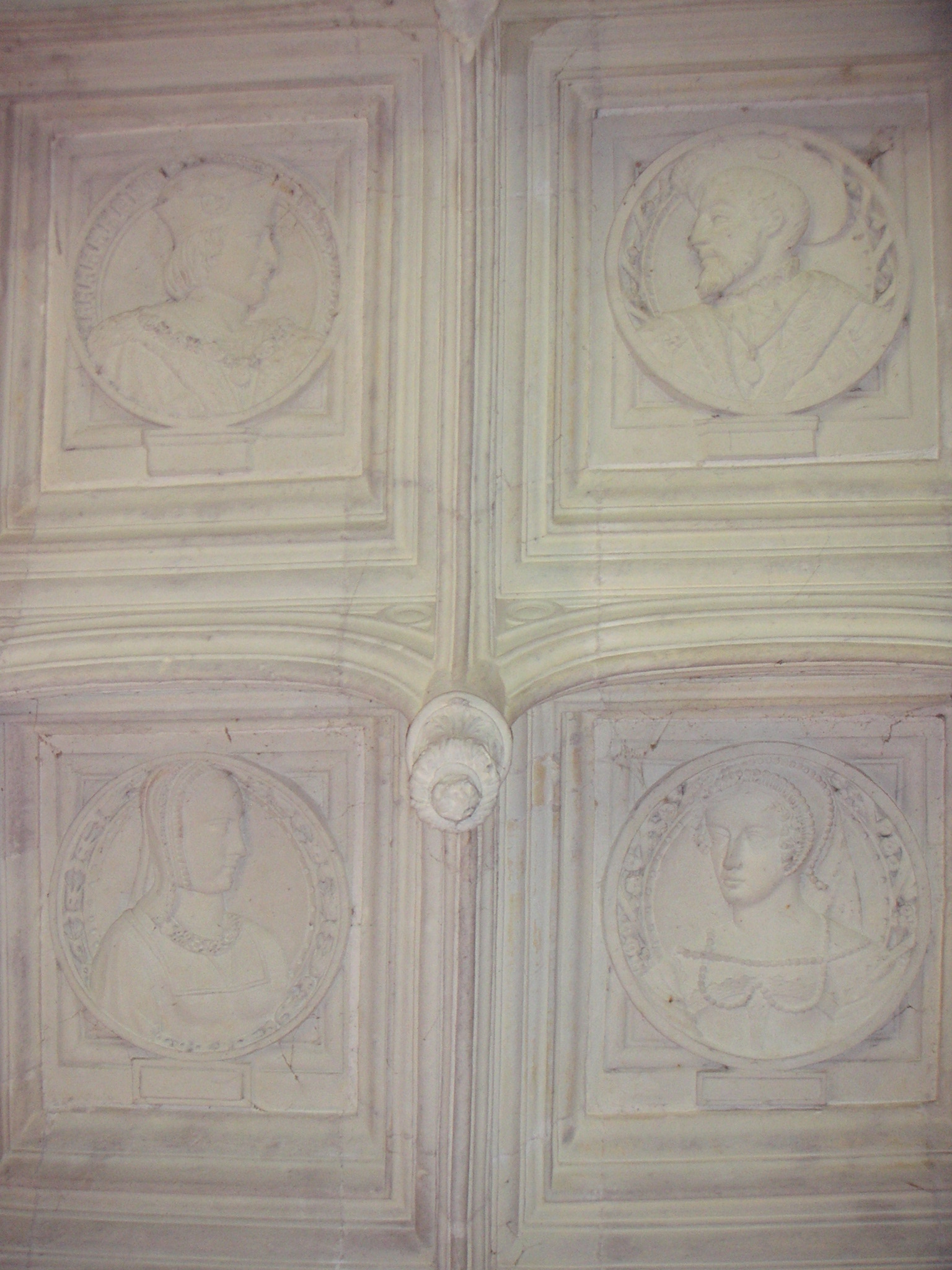
Detail of the staircase ceiling

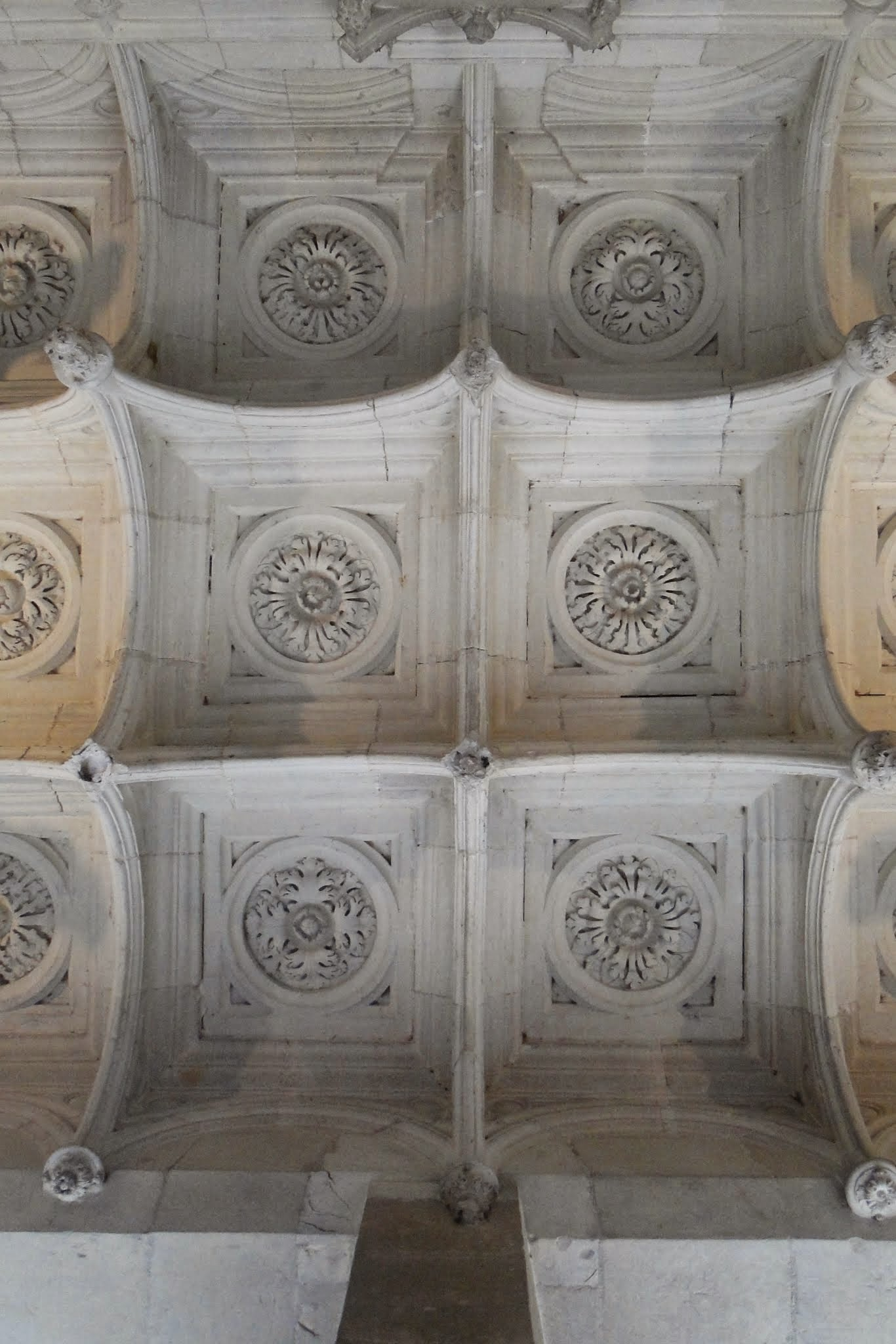
Decorative ceiling of the staircase

== See also ==
- Châteaux of the Loire Valley
- French Renaissance architecture
- Monument historique
- List of World Heritage Sites in France
