= Azay-le-Rideau =

- Commune
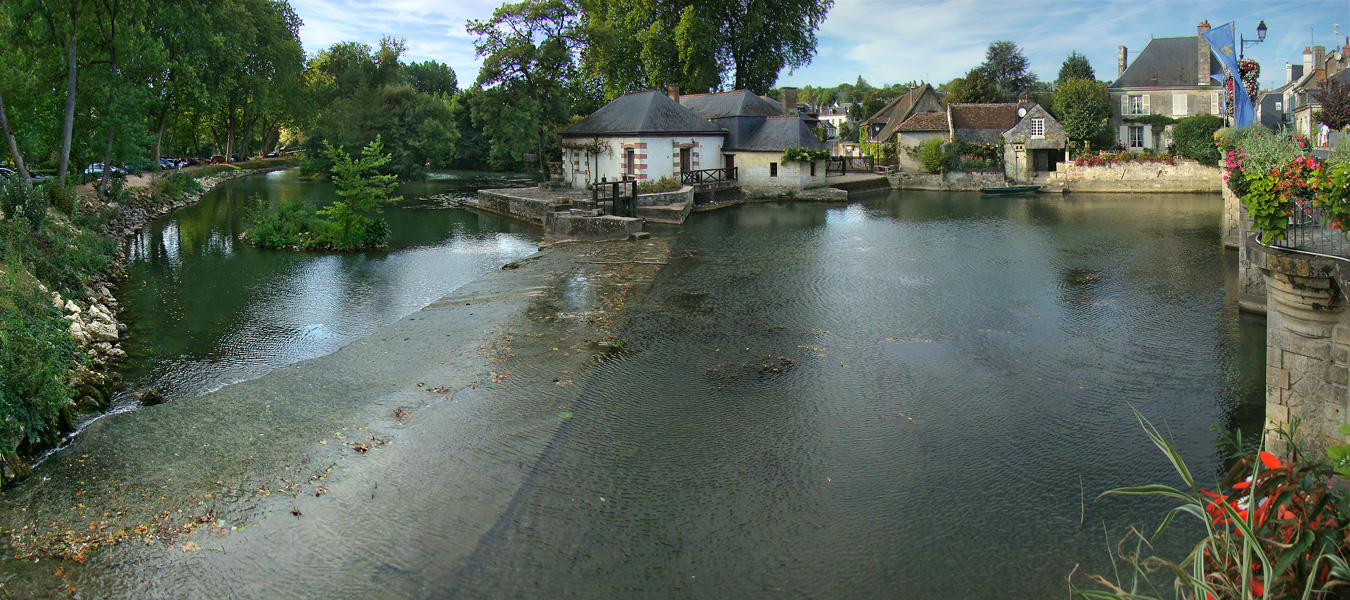

- Coat of arms
- Location of Azay-le-Rideau
- Location within France Location within Centre-Val de Loire
- Coordinates: 47°15′44″N 0°28′01″E
- Country: France
- Region: Centre-Val de Loire
- Department: Indre-et-Loire
- Arrondissement: Tours
- Canton: Chinon
- Intercommunality: CC Touraine Vallée Indre

Government
  - Mayor (2020–2026): Sylvia Gaurier
- Area^{1}: 27.34 km^{2} (10.56 sq mi)
- Elevation: 45 m (148 ft)
- Highest elevation: 102 m (335 ft)
- Lowest elevation: 36 m (118 ft)
- Population (2023): 3,438
  - Density: 125.7/km^{2} (325.7/sq mi)
- Time zone: UTC+01:00 (CET)
  - Summer (DST): UTC+02:00 (CEST)
- INSEE/Postal code: 37014 /37190
- ^{1} French Land Register data, which excludes lakes, ponds, glaciers > 1 km^{2} (0.386 sq mi or 247 acres) and river estuaries.

Azay-le-Rideau (French pronunciation: [azɛ lə ʁido]) is a commune in the Indre-et-Loire department in the Centre-Val de Loire region in central-west France.

== Château ==
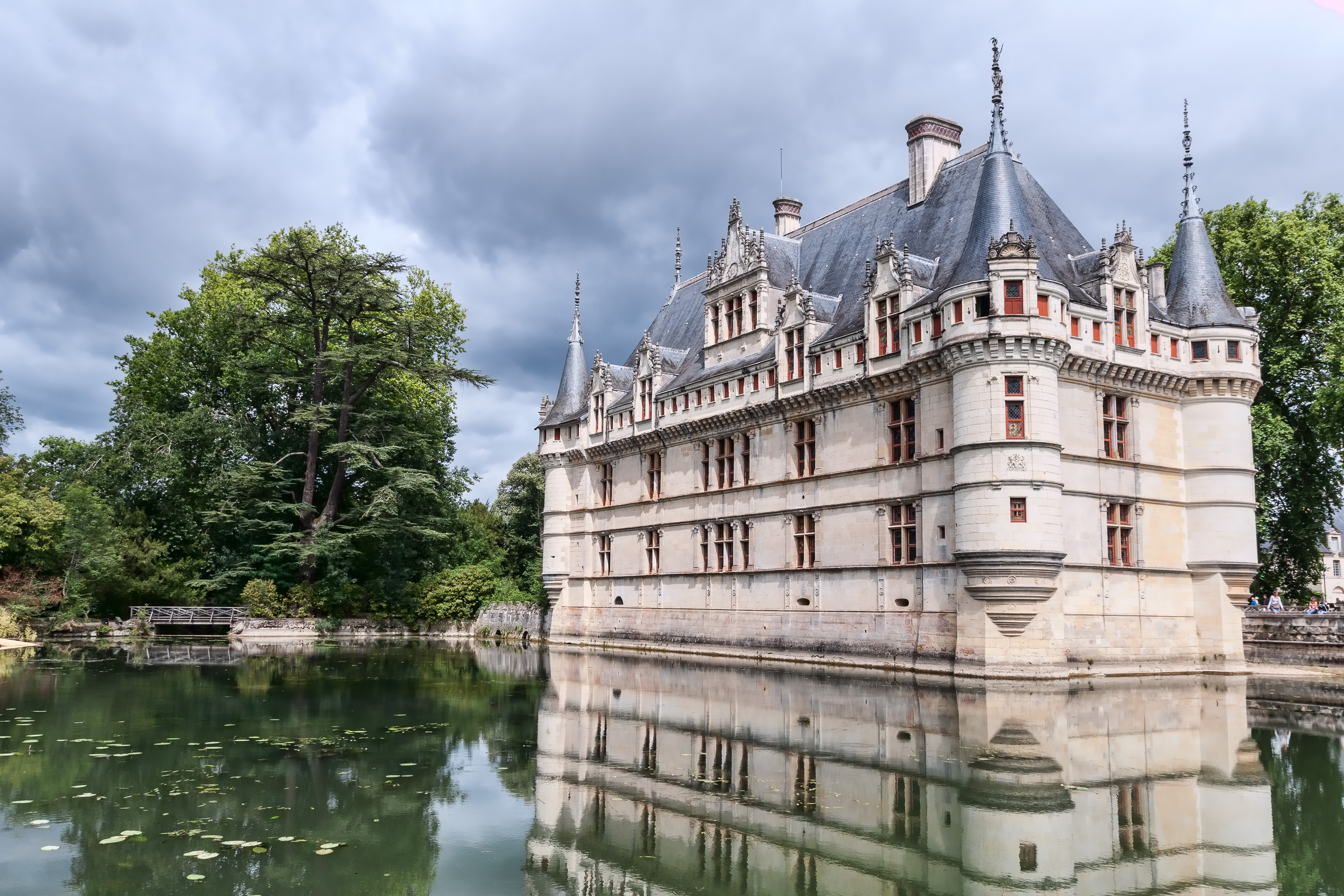
The Château

The château of Azay-le-Rideau was built from 1515 to 1527, one of the earliest French Renaissance châteaux. Built on an island in the river Indre, its foundations rise straight out of the water. It is one of the best known of the châteaux of the Loire valley.

== Church ==
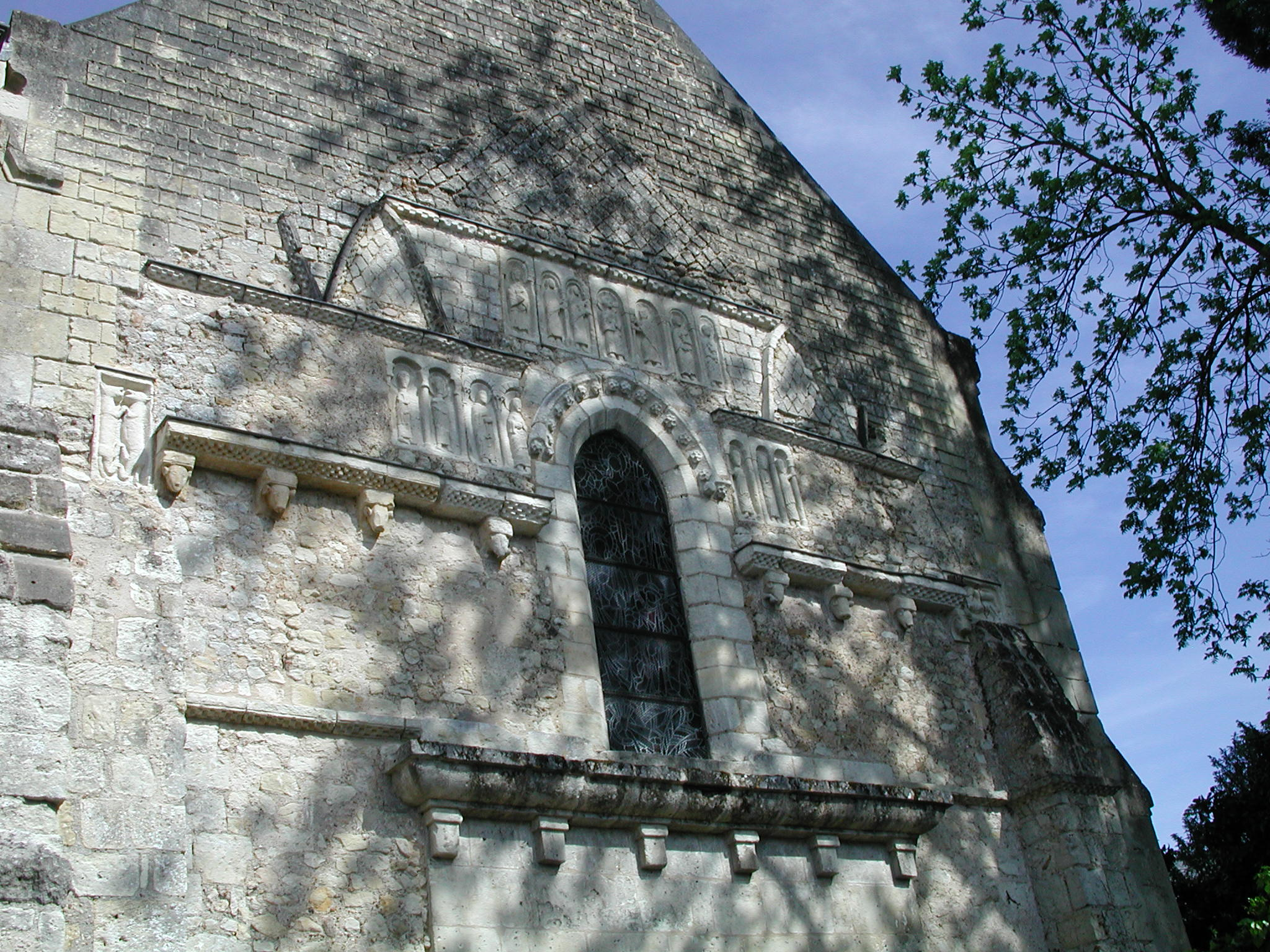
Carolingian portion of the façade of St. Symphorien

There is a church dedicated to Saint Symphorien near the château that is interesting for the number of architectural periods incorporated in its design. While the newest portion dates from 1603, the current façade incorporates an older 9th century façade in the Carolingian style. The original carved figures are still visible, though an added window destroyed part of the second row. The rest of the church is of a Romanesque style. It was built between 1518 and 1527.

== Wine ==
Azay-le-Rideau is the centre of the Touraine Azay-le-Rideau AOC for white and rosé wine.

== Population ==
Historical population
Year	Pop.	±% p.a.
1968	2,755	—
1975	2,749	−0.03%
1982	2,915	+0.84%
1990	3,053	+0.58%
1999	3,100	+0.17%
2007	3,408	+1.19%
2012	3,431	+0.13%
2017	3,491	+0.35%
2023	3,438	−0.25%
Source: INSEE

== Twin towns ==
Azay-le-Rideau is twinned with Croston in Lancashire, England.

== In popular culture ==
The exterior design of the château d'Azay-le-Rideau's main building (as well as its surrounding area, for the most part) was used by Konami video game developing company as the prime inspiration and a direct structural base of the "Villa" location in the video games Castlevania 64 (appears during "Stage 03" of the game) and Castlevania: Legacy of Darkness (appears during "Stage 04" of the game), both of which were released for Nintendo 64 home TV video gaming platform during January and November 1999 respectively.

== See also ==
- Communes of the Indre-et-Loire department
