= Trégonce =

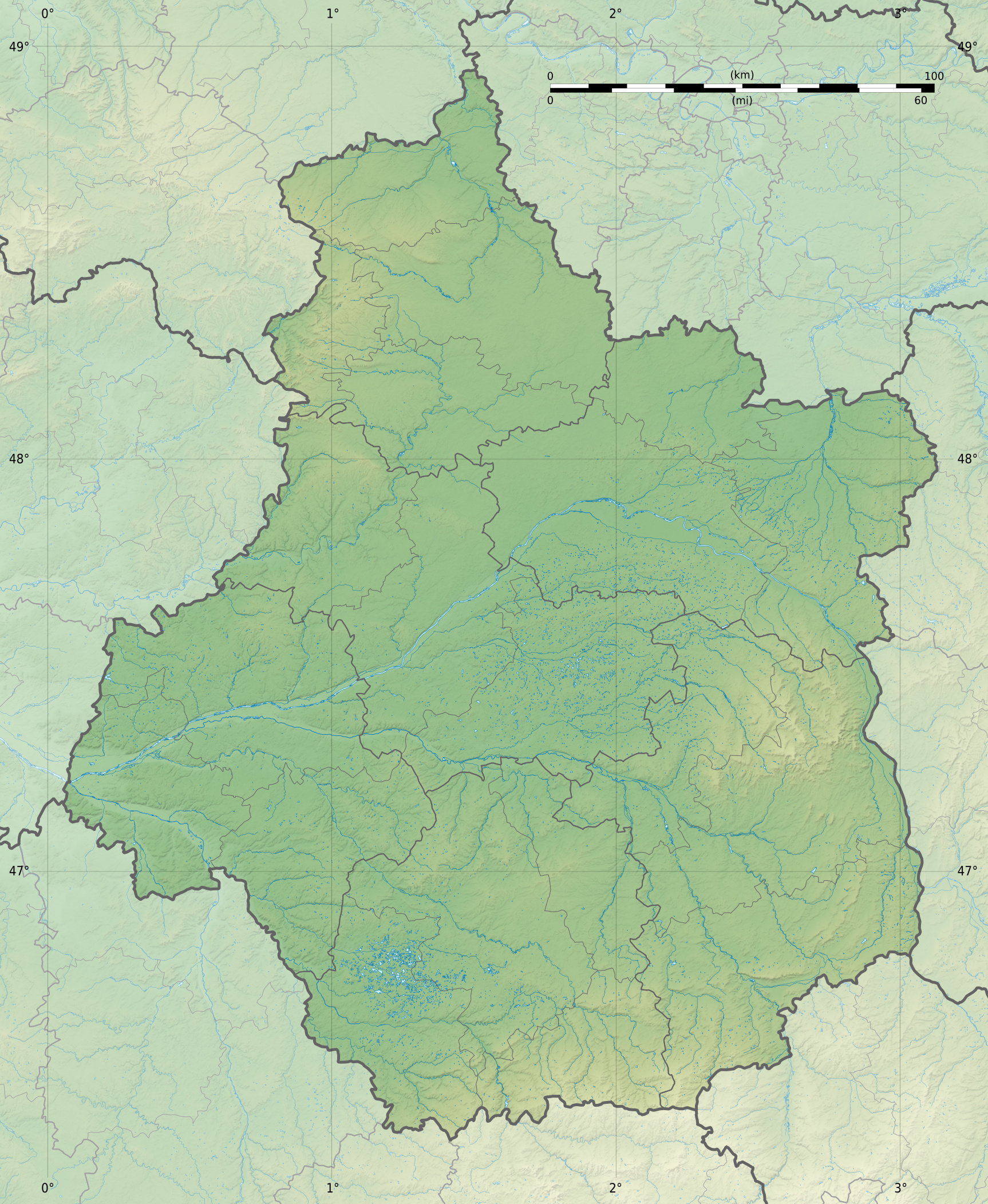
- Location within France Location within Centre-Val de Loire

Location
- Country: France

Physical characteristics
- Mouth: Indre
  - coordinates: 46.8423°N 1.5333°E
- Length: 17.2 km (10.7 mi)

Basin features
- Progression: Indre→ Loire→ Atlantic Ocean

The Trégonce (French pronunciation: [tʁeɡɔ̃s]) is a river of France which flows in the department of Indre, in the Centre-Val de Loire region. It is a 17.2-kilometre-long (10.7 mi) right tributary of the river Indre. The Trégonce has a tributary stream, the Fontaines. The Trégonce rises in the commune of Levroux and flows generally southward. It passes through the communes of Chezelles, Levroux, Villegongis, Vineuil, and Villedieu-sur-Indre, where it joins the Indre as a right-bank tributary. Through the Indre, its water reaches the Loire and then the Atlantic Ocean. The river's only named tributary is the Fontaines stream, and it receives several other minor tributaries of less than 10 km (6.2 mi).

== Hydrology ==
A gauging station at Vineuil monitors the flow of the Trégonce over a 21 km^{2} (8.1 sq mi) section of its drainage basin. The recorded mean annual discharge (module) is 0.15 cubic metres per second.

Under the Water Framework Directive, the Trégonce and its tributaries are classified as water body FRGR2037. According to the 2013 assessment by the Loire-Bretagne river basin district, the water body was assigned a "moderate" ecological status, with "good" ecological status identified as the management objective.
