= Préverenges =

- Municipality
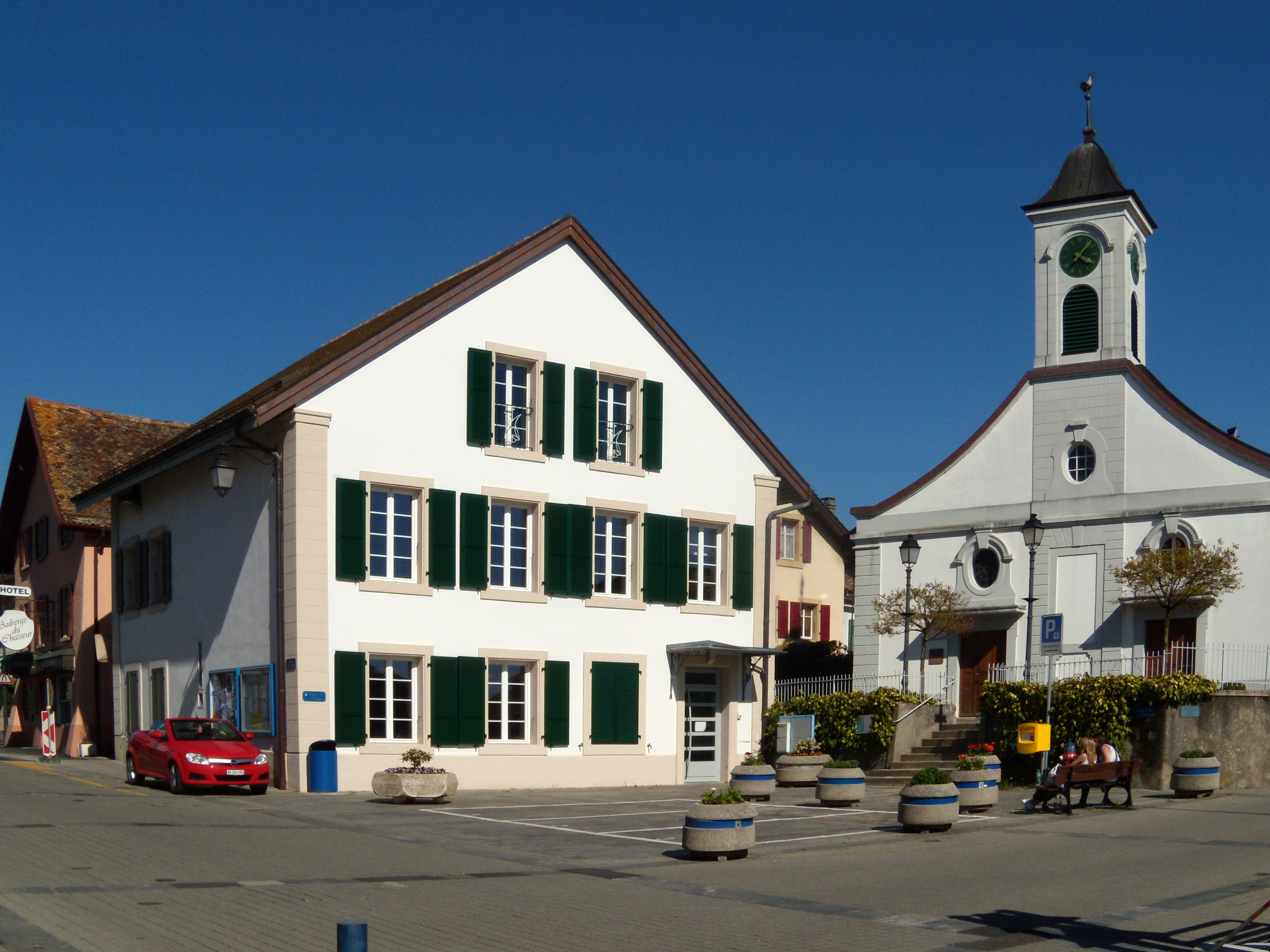
- Préverenges village center

- Flag Coat of arms
- Location of Préverenges
- Location within Switzerland Location within Canton of Vaud
- Coordinates: 46°31′N 06°32′E
- Country: Switzerland
- Canton: Vaud
- District: Morges

Government
  - Mayor: Syndic; Guy Delacretaz

Area
  - Total: 1.9 km^{2} (0.73 sq mi)
- Elevation: 405 m (1,329 ft)

Population (2003)
  - Total: 4,059
  - Density: 2,100/km^{2} (5,500/sq mi)
- Time zone: UTC+01:00 (CET)
  - Summer (DST): UTC+02:00 (CEST)
- Postal code: 1028
- SFOS number: 5643
- ISO 3166 code: CH-VD
- Surrounded by: Denges, Lonay, Morges, Publier (FR-74), Saint-Sulpice
- Twin towns: Préveranges (France)
- Website: www.preverenges.ch

Préverenges (French pronunciation: [pʁevʁɑ̃ʒ]) is a municipality in the Swiss canton of Vaud, located in the district of Morges. It is a Suburb of the city of Lausanne.

== History ==
Préverenges is first mentioned in 1224 as Preverenges.

== Geography ==
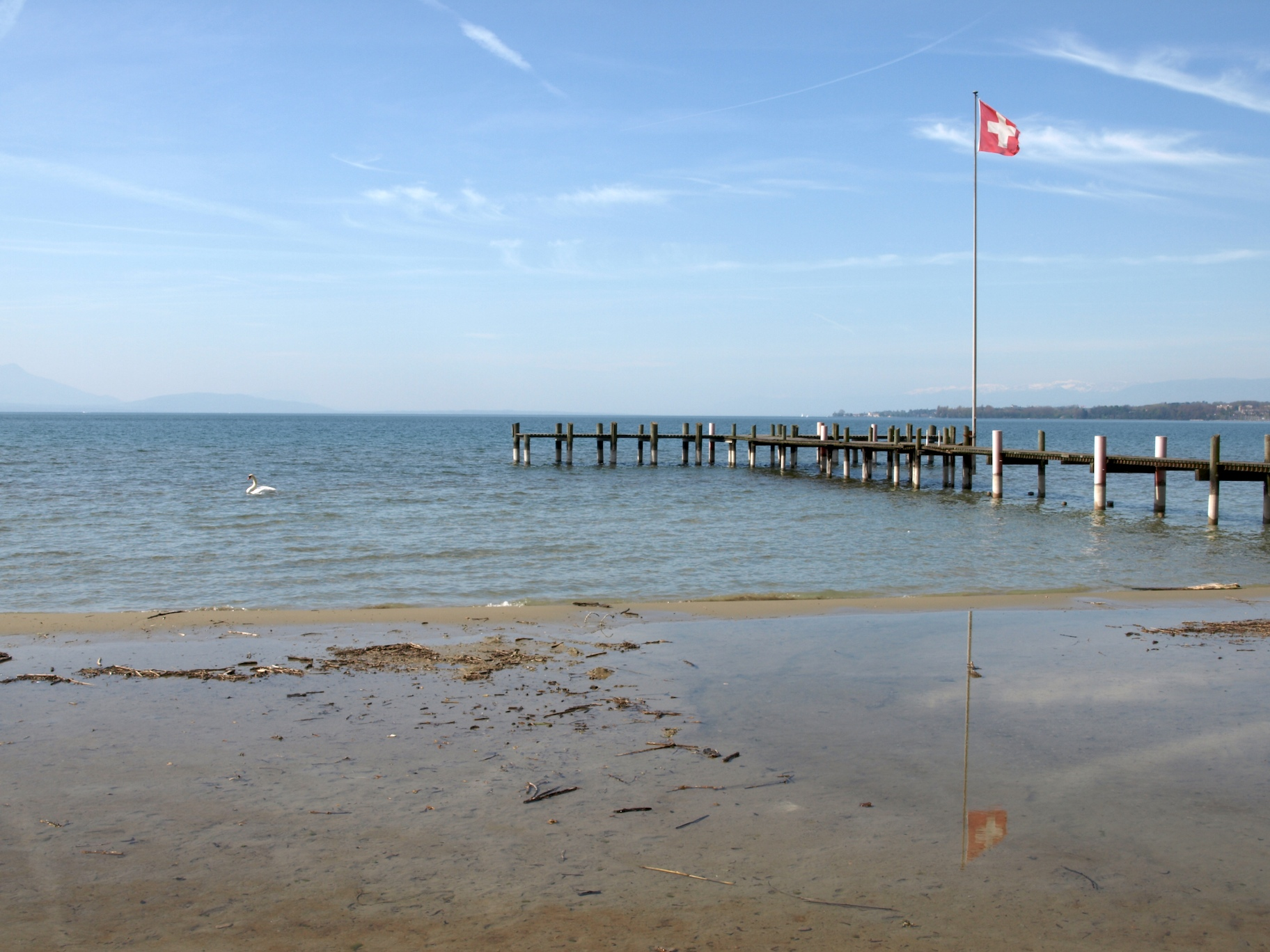
Préverenges waterfront

Préverenges has an area, as of 2009, of 1.9 square kilometers (0.73 mi^{2}). Of this area, 0.61 km^{2} (0.24 mi^{2}) or 32.8% is used for agricultural purposes, while 0.1 km^{2} (0.039 mi^{2}) or 5.4% is forested. Of the rest of the land, 1.12 km^{2} (0.43 mi^{2}) or 60.2% is settled (buildings or roads), 0.01 km^{2} (2.5 acres) or 0.5% is either rivers or lakes.

Of the built up area, industrial buildings made up 7.0% of the total area while housing and buildings made up 32.8% and transportation infrastructure made up 10.8%. Power and water infrastructure as well as other special developed areas made up 3.8% of the area while parks, green belts and sports fields made up 5.9%. Out of the forested land, 2.7% of the total land area is heavily forested and 2.7% is covered with orchards or small clusters of trees. Of the agricultural land, 25.8% is used for growing crops and 1.1% is pastures, while 5.9% is used for orchards or vine crops. All the water in the municipality is flowing water.

The municipality was part of the Morges District until it was dissolved on 31 August 2006, and Préverenges became part of the new district of Morges.

The municipality is located on Lake Geneva along the Lausanne-Geneva road.

== Coat of arms ==
The blazon of the municipal coat of arms is Azure, a Sail-ship affrontee with two Sails Argent.

== Demographics ==
Préverenges has a population (as of December 2020) of 5,242. As of 2008, 27.4% of the population are resident foreign nationals. Over the last 10 years (1999–2009) the population has changed at a rate of 18%. It has changed at a rate of 9.4% due to migration and at a rate of 8.7% due to births and deaths.

Most of the population (as of 2000) speaks French (3,428 or 84.1%), with German being second most common (206 or 5.1%) and Italian being third (123 or 3.0%). There are 6 people who speak Romansh.

Of the population in the municipality 624 or about 15.3% were born in Préverenges and lived there in 2000. There were 1,447 or 35.5% who were born in the same canton, while 758 or 18.6% were born somewhere else in Switzerland, and 1,109 or 27.2% were born outside of Switzerland.

In 2008 there were 38 live births to Swiss citizens and 19 births to non-Swiss citizens, and in same time span there were 16 deaths of Swiss citizens and 5 non-Swiss citizen deaths. Ignoring immigration and emigration, the population of Swiss citizens increased by 22 while the foreign population increased by 14. There were 11 Swiss men and 4 Swiss women who emigrated from Switzerland. At the same time, there were 38 non-Swiss men and 39 non-Swiss women who immigrated from another country to Switzerland. The total Swiss population change in 2008 (from all sources, including moves across municipal borders) was an increase of 2 and the non-Swiss population increased by 72 people. This represents a population growth rate of 1.6%.

The age distribution, as of 2009, in Préverenges is; 569 children or 11.8% of the population are between 0 and 9 years old and 509 teenagers or 10.5% are between 10 and 19. Of the adult population, 599 people or 12.4% of the population are between 20 and 29 years old. 818 people or 16.9% are between 30 and 39, 723 people or 15.0% are between 40 and 49, and 627 people or 13.0% are between 50 and 59. The senior population distribution is 598 people or 12.4% of the population are between 60 and 69 years old, 281 people or 5.8% are between 70 and 79, there are 101 people or 2.1% who are between 80 and 89, and there are 11 people or 0.2% who are 90 and older.

As of 2000, there were 1,646 people who were single and never married in the municipality. There were 1,989 married individuals, 148 widows or widowers and 295 individuals who are divorced.

As of 2000, there were 1,754 private households in the municipality, and an average of 2.3 persons per household. There were 555 households that consist of only one person and 87 households with five or more people. Out of a total of 1,789 households that answered this question, 31.0% were households made up of just one person and there were 6 adults who lived with their parents. Of the rest of the households, there are 494 married couples without children, 570 married couples with children There were 98 single parents with a child or children. There were 31 households that were made up of unrelated people and 35 households that were made up of some sort of institution or another collective housing.

In 2000 there were 300 single family homes (or 56.3% of the total) out of a total of 533 inhabited buildings. There were 164 multi-family buildings (30.8%), along with 54 multi-purpose buildings that were mostly used for housing (10.1%) and 15 other use buildings (commercial or industrial) that also had some housing (2.8%). Of the single family homes 21 were built before 1919, while 33 were built between 1990 and 2000. The greatest number of single family homes (70) were built between 1981 and 1990. The most multi-family homes (45) were built between 1971 and 1980 and the next most (32) were built between 1981 and 1990. There were 5 multi-family houses built between 1996 and 2000.

In 2000 there were 1,942 apartments in the municipality. The most common apartment size was 3 rooms of which there were 651. There were 153 single room apartments and 334 apartments with five or more rooms. Of these apartments, a total of 1,729 apartments (89.0% of the total) were permanently occupied, while 190 apartments (9.8%) were seasonally occupied and 23 apartments (1.2%) were empty. As of 2009, the construction rate of new housing units was 6.6 new units per 1000 residents. The vacancy rate for the municipality, in 2010, was 0.08%.

The historical population is given in the following chart:

== Twin Town ==
Préverenges is twinned with the town of Préveranges, France.

== Politics ==
In the 2007 federal election the most popular party was the SP which received 25.77% of the vote. The next three most popular parties were the SVP (19.1%), the Green Party (15.08%) and the FDP (13.86%). In the federal election, a total of 1,197 votes were cast, and the voter turnout was 43.8%.

== Economy ==
As of 2010, Préverenges had an unemployment rate of 4.6%. As of 2008, there were 15 people employed in the primary economic sector and about 3 businesses involved in this sector. 355 people were employed in the secondary sector and there were 37 businesses in this sector. 750 people were employed in the tertiary sector, with 145 businesses in this sector. There were 2,263 residents of the municipality who were employed in some capacity, of which females made up 43.8% of the workforce.

In 2008 the total number of full-time equivalent jobs was 959. The number of jobs in the primary sector was 10, of which 9 were in agriculture and 1 was in fishing or fisheries. The number of jobs in the secondary sector was 331 of which 213 or (64.4%) were in manufacturing and 119 (36.0%) were in construction. The number of jobs in the tertiary sector was 618. In the tertiary sector; 257 or 41.6% were in wholesale or retail sales or the repair of motor vehicles, 31 or 5.0% were in the movement and storage of goods, 21 or 3.4% were in a hotel or restaurant, 89 or 14.4% were in the information industry, 75 or 12.1% were technical professionals or scientists, 60 or 9.7% were in education and 18 or 2.9% were in health care.

In 2000, there were 802 workers who commuted into the municipality and 1,910 workers who commuted away. The municipality is a net exporter of workers, with about 2.4 workers leaving the municipality for every one entering. About 2.7% of the workforce coming into Préverenges are coming from outside Switzerland. Of the working population, 17.4% used public transportation to get to work, and 67% used a private car.

== Religion ==
From the 2000 census, 1,507 or 37.0% were Roman Catholic, while 1,550 or 38.0% belonged to the Swiss Reformed Church. Of the rest of the population, there were 78 members of an Orthodox church (or about 1.91% of the population), there were 2 individuals (or about 0.05% of the population) who belonged to the Christian Catholic Church, and there were 154 individuals (or about 3.78% of the population) who belonged to another Christian church. There were 6 individuals (or about 0.15% of the population) who were Jewish, and 56 (or about 1.37% of the population) who were Muslim. There were 4 individuals who were Buddhist, 3 individuals who were Hindu and 7 individuals who belonged to another church. 570 (or about 13.98% of the population) belonged to no church, are agnostic or atheist, and 211 individuals (or about 5.17% of the population) did not answer the question.

== Education ==
In Préverenges about 1,496 or (36.7%) of the population have completed non-mandatory upper secondary education, and 798 or (19.6%) have completed additional higher education (either university or a Fachhochschule). Of the 798 who completed tertiary schooling, 47.5% were Swiss men, 27.1% were Swiss women, 14.9% were non-Swiss men and 10.5% were non-Swiss women.

In the 2009/2010 school year there were a total of 515 students in the Préverenges school district. In the Vaud cantonal school system, two years of non-obligatory pre-school are provided by the political districts. During the school year, the political district provided pre-school care for a total of 631 children of which 203 children (32.2%) received subsidized pre-school care. The canton's primary school program requires students to attend for four years. There were 296 students in the municipal primary school program. The obligatory lower secondary school program lasts for six years and there were 213 students in those schools. There were also 6 students who were home schooled or attended another non-traditional school.

As of 2000, there were 99 students in Préverenges who came from another municipality, while 266 residents attended schools outside the municipality.
