= Indre (river) =

River in France

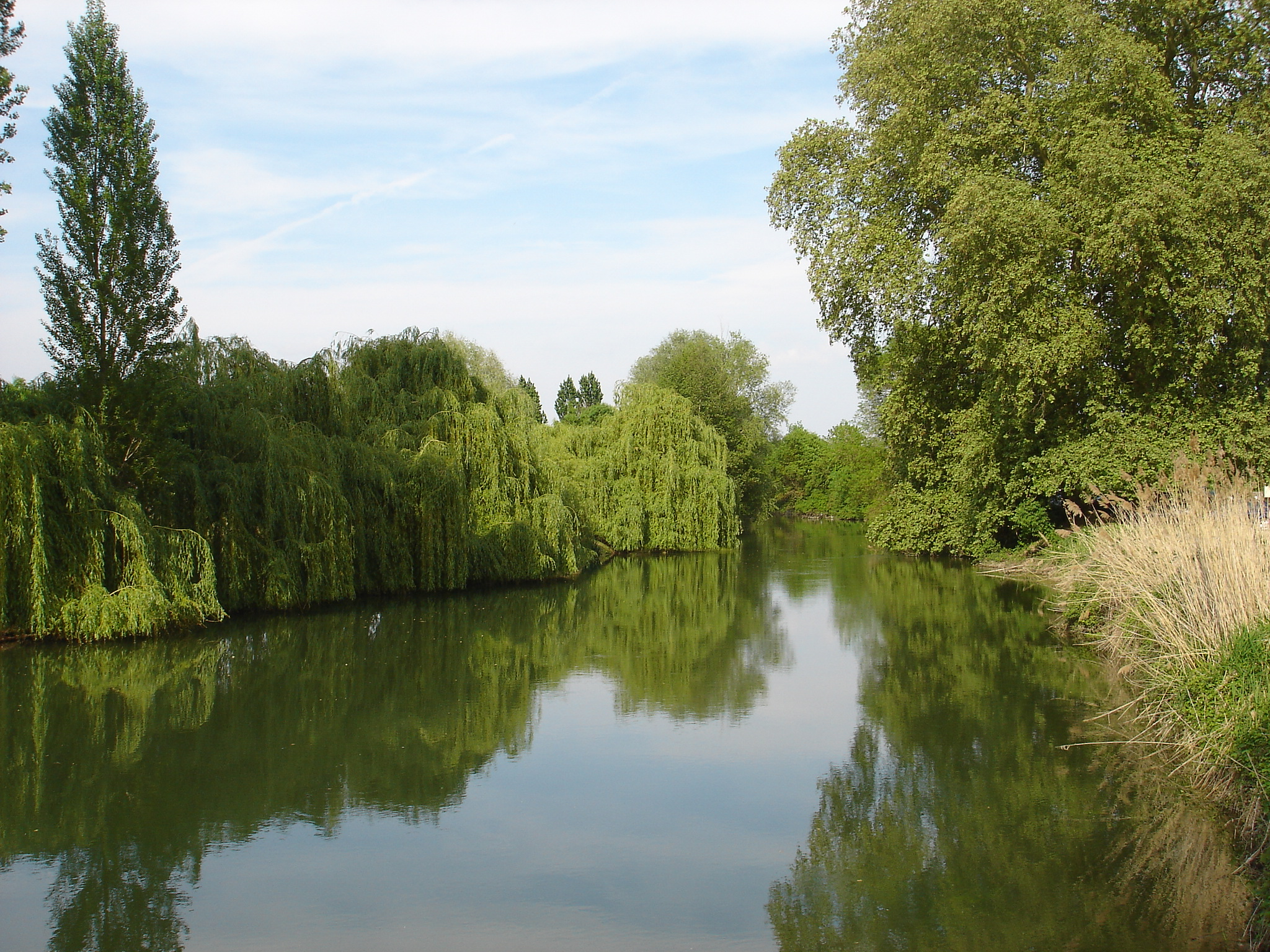
- The Indre near Rigny-Ussé

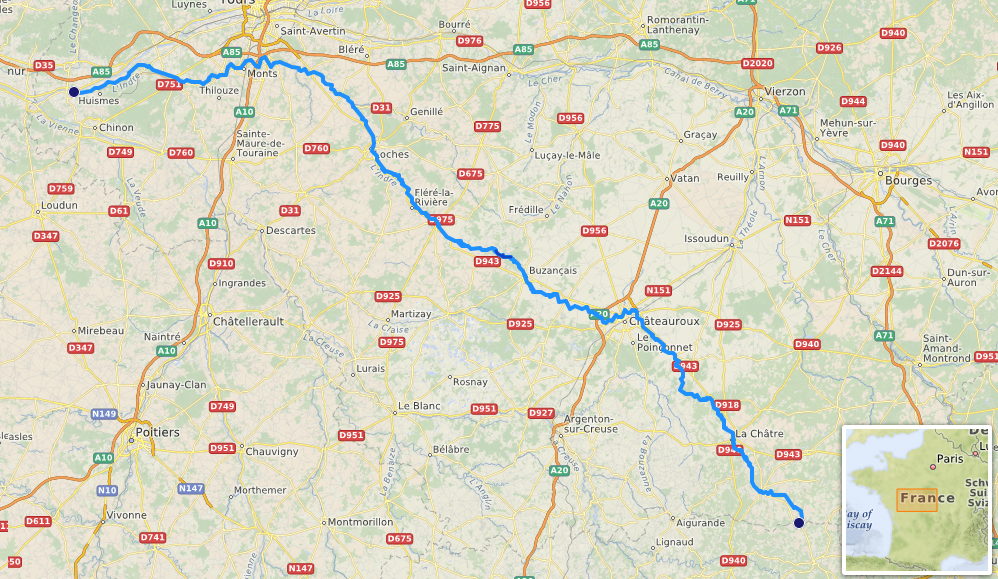
- Native name: L'Indre (French)

Location
- Country: France

Physical characteristics
- Source
  - location: near Préveranges, Cher
  - elevation: 504 m (1,654 ft)
- Mouth
  - location: Loire
  - coordinates: 47°14′2″N 0°11′0″E
- Length: 279.3 km (173.5 mi)
- Basin size: 3,462 km^{2} (1,337 mi^{2})
- Discharge
  - average: 19 m^{3}/s (670 cu ft/s)

Basin features
- Progression: Loire→ Atlantic Ocean

The Indre (French pronunciation: [ɛ̃dʁ]) is a 279.3 km (173.5 mi) long river in central France, a left tributary to the Loire.

Its source is in the department of Cher, near Préveranges. It flows through the departments of Cher, Indre and Indre-et-Loire. It flows generally northwest, through the communes of La Châtre, Châteauroux and Loches.

It joins the Loire near the site of the Chinon nuclear power plant, north of Avoine.

Its main tributary is the Indrois, which joins at Azay-sur-Indre. A smaller tributary is the Trégonce.

Departments and towns along the river:

- Cher
- Indre: La Châtre, Châteauroux
- Indre-et-Loire: Loches
