= Préveranges =

- Commune
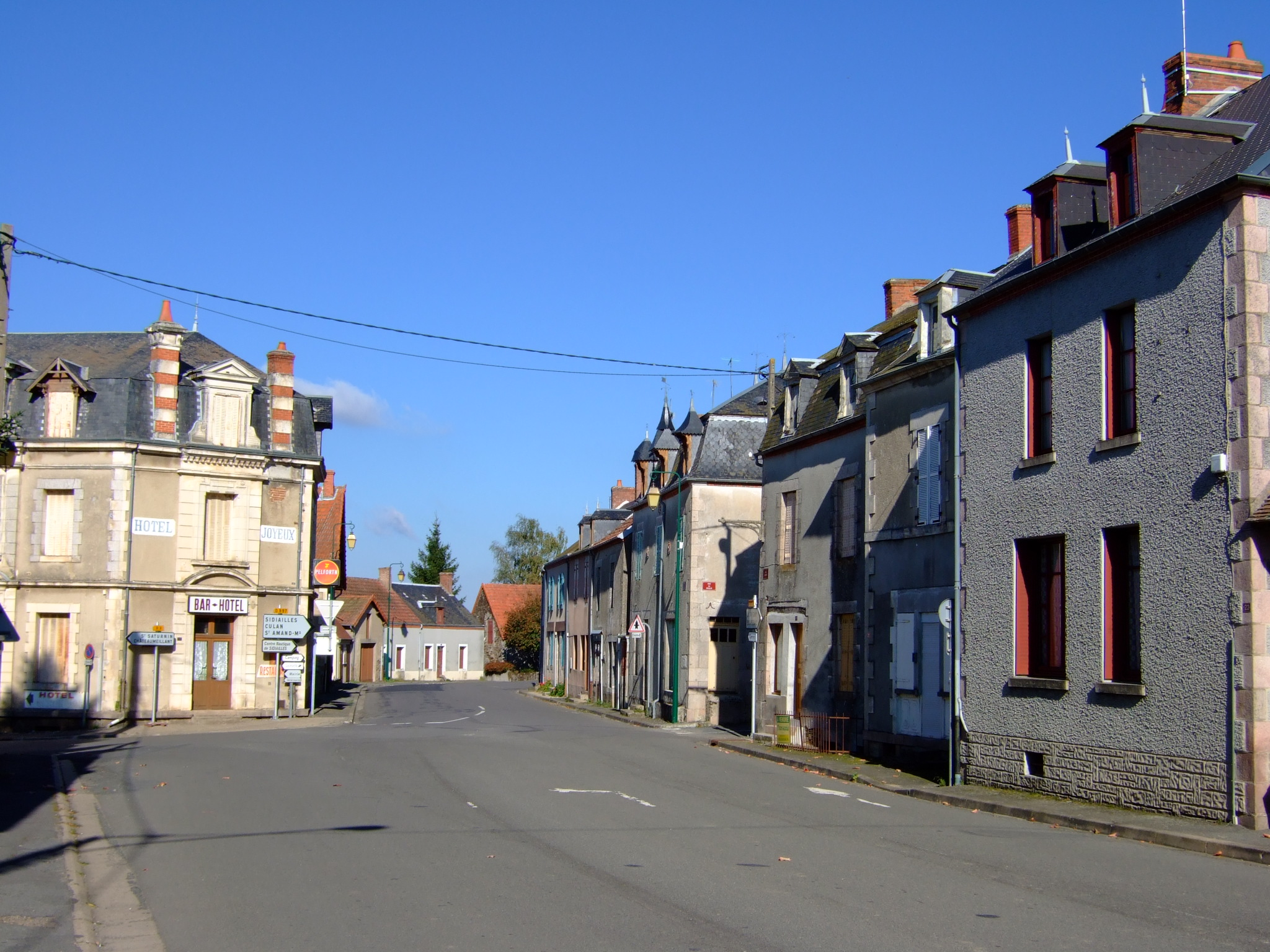
- The centre of the village

- Coat of arms
- Location of Préveranges
- Location within France Location within Centre-Val de Loire
- Coordinates: 46°26′00″N 2°15′20″E
- Country: France
- Region: Centre-Val de Loire
- Department: Cher
- Arrondissement: Saint-Amand-Montrond
- Canton: Châteaumeillant

Government
  - Mayor (2020–2026): Fabrice Pigois
- Area^{1}: 38.16 km^{2} (14.73 sq mi)
- Elevation: 471 m (1,545 ft)
- Highest elevation: 504 m (1,654 ft)
- Lowest elevation: 285 m (935 ft)
- Population (2023): 520
  - Density: 14/km^{2} (35/sq mi)
- Time zone: UTC+01:00 (CET)
  - Summer (DST): UTC+02:00 (CEST)
- INSEE/Postal code: 18187 /18370
- ^{1} French Land Register data, which excludes lakes, ponds, glaciers > 1 km^{2} (0.386 sq mi or 247 acres) and river estuaries.

Préveranges (French pronunciation: [pʁevʁɑ̃ʒ]) is a commune in the Cher department in the Centre-Val de Loire region of France.

== Geography ==
A large farming area comprising the village and many hamlets situated by the banks of the small river Joyeuse, some 44 miles (71 km) south of Bourges, at the junction of the D10 with the D120 road. The commune is bordered to the south by the river Arnon. The commune borders both the departments of Allier and Creuse and is the highest point in the Cher department.

== Population ==
Historical population
Year	Pop.	±% p.a.
1968	1,081	—
1975	930	−2.13%
1982	861	−1.10%
1990	772	−1.35%
1999	665	−1.64%
2007	585	−1.59%
2012	578	−0.24%
2017	525	−1.91%
2023	520	−0.16%
Source: INSEE

== Sights ==
- The church of St. Martin, dating from the thirteenth century.
- The fifteenth-century chateau at La Preugne.
- The tower of a thirteenth-century castle in the woods.
- A nineteenth-century house.
- A watermill at Marcoh.

== International relations ==
The commune is twinned with:

- Préverenges, Switzerland

== See also ==
- Communes of the Cher department
