= Pillar of Yzeures-sur-Creuse =

Ancient monumental column

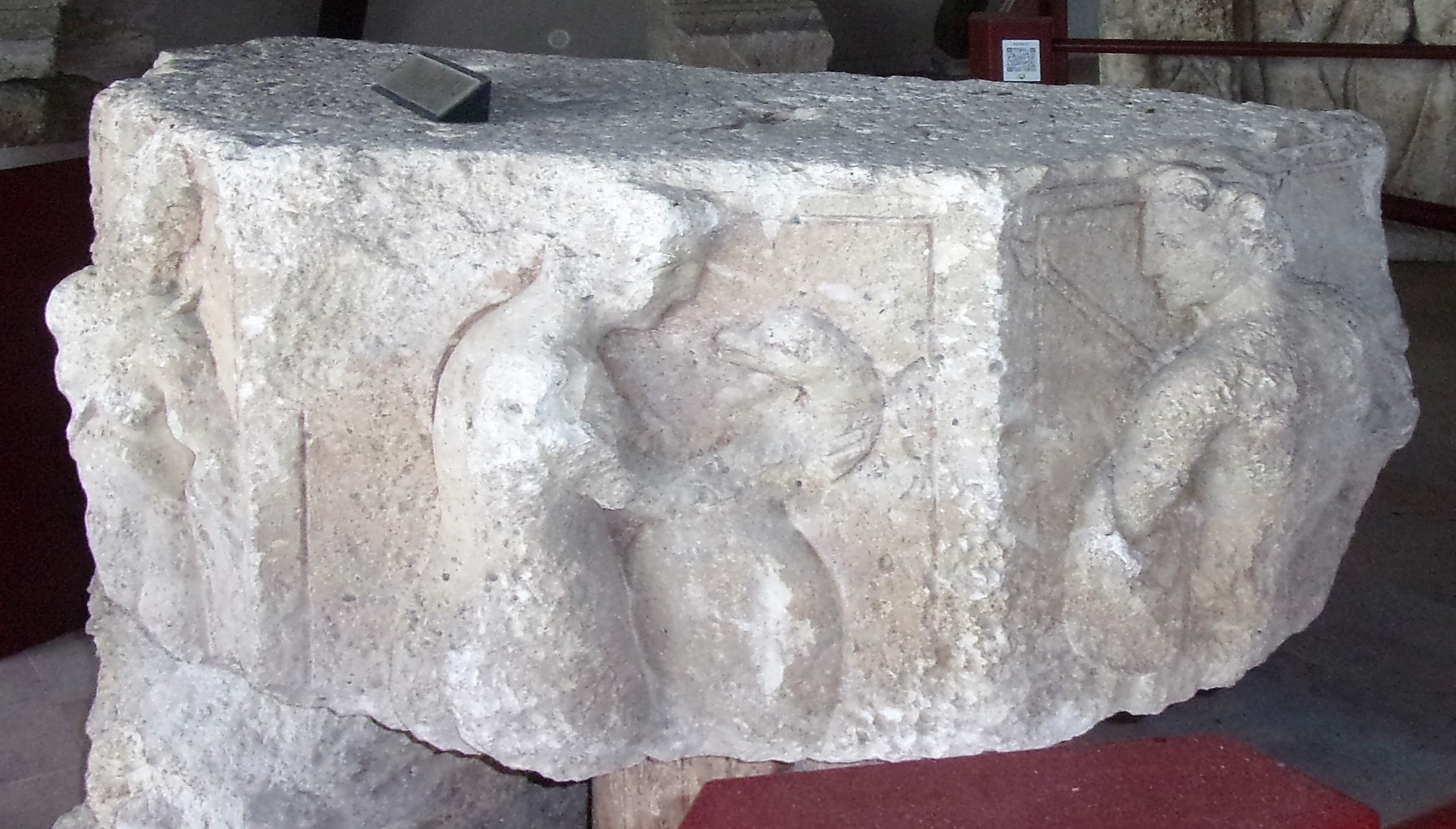
- Leda, the swan, Castor and Pollux (level 3)
- Type: Column
- Material: Shelly limestone
- Period/culture: Early 3rd century
- Discovered: 1895; Yzeures-sur-Creuse
- Place: Minerva Museum
- Coordinates: 46°47′10″N 0°52′14″E
- Registration: Listed as a MH (1896)
- Culture: Gallo-Roman

The pillar of Yzeures-sur-Creuse is an ancient monumental column constructed from Jurassic limestone with shell inclusions. Some remnants were discovered in and near the foundations of the former church of the French commune of Yzeures-sur-Creuse, in Indre-et-Loire in 1895.

The reconstruction of the parish church of Notre Dame, which started in 1895, led to the discovery of numerous ancient stone blocks and some Merovingian sarcophagi in the foundation trenches. Among the nearly one hundred blocks unearthed during the initial works (1895) and subsequent excavations (1896), twenty-one were identified as undoubtedly belonging to a monumental pillar. The blocks are organized into three levels of bas-relief sculptures representing Roman deities and Greek heroes, likely topped by a now-lost statue. The recovered elements suggest a monument about nine meters high, probably built in the early 3rd century in honor of the emperor through allegorical representations. The pillar is likely part of a complex of monuments and cult buildings that also includes at least one temple, possibly dedicated to Minerva, as evidenced by an epigraphy, and an altar, all belonging to a still unidentified secondary settlement. The site's religious function continued into the Early Middle Ages with the construction of a Merovingian church that reused elements of the ancient monuments in its foundations.

The preserved blocks of Yzeures-sur-Creuse, which were listed as protected objects in 1896 and integrated into the Palissy base in 1992, have been on display since 1972 at the Minerva Museum, which is situated in the same commune as the excavation site where the blocks were discovered. In 1972, the pillar-related artifacts were subjected to a comprehensive examination; in 2014, they were integrated into a broader investigation of all the lapidary remains of Yzeures-sur-Creuse.

== Discovery and chronology of studies ==
=== Fortuitous discovery and excavations ===
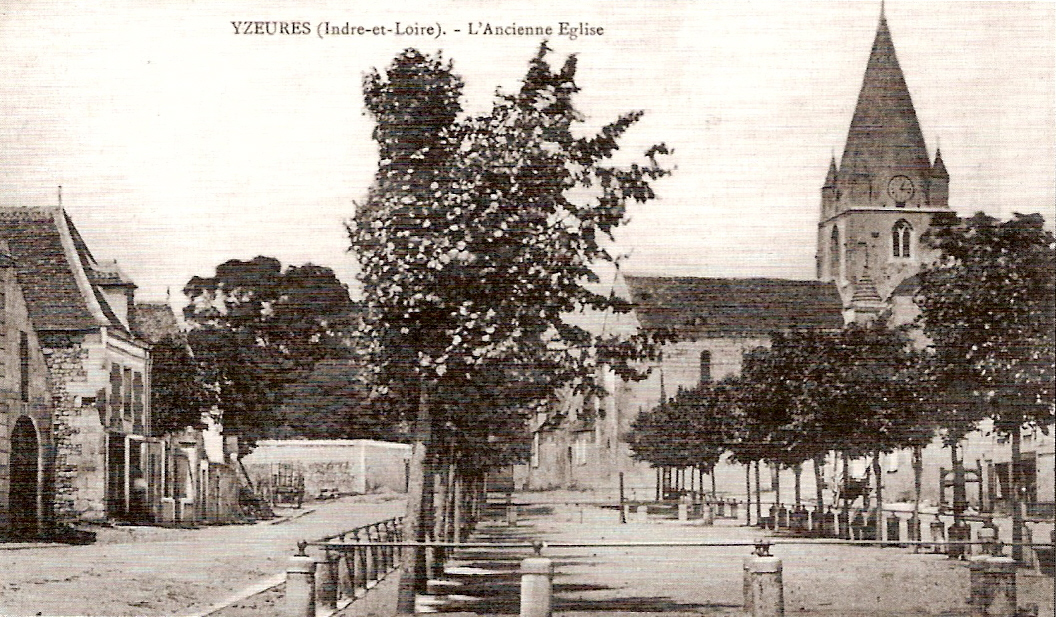
Old church of Yzeures

In 1894, a decision was made to demolish the 12th-century church of Yzeures-sur-Creuse, which was in disrepair and too small to accommodate the congregation. The decision was made to rebuild on a different site. The excavation started in 1895, (Note: Tendron 2010, p. 3: Découverte et historique des recherches) uncovering and removing about ten sculpted blocks, which appeared to serve as foundations for a building measuring 10 × 5 meters. (Note: Adam & Jambon 1972, pp. 99–100) This vanished building may have been a Merovingian church as referenced by Gregory of Tours. Additional blocks were discovered in the trenches but temporarily retained in situ. (Note: Tendron 2010, p. 4: Découverte et historique des recherches) Camille de La Croix posited that these blocks appeared to delineate the location of this church.

Plan of the former Yzeures church, based on an annotated drawing by Charles Normand in 1896

In November 1895, the Archaeological Society of Touraine (SAT) and its president, Louis-Auguste Bosseboeuf, were informed of the discovery of the ruins of Sanxay. Father Camille de La Croix, the discoverer of the ruins, conducted excavations from February 10 to 22, 1896, along the southern wall and the facade of the old nave. He identified approximately 85 or 95 blocks, (Note: The documents published by Father de La Croix do not provide clarity regarding the number of additional blocks he extracted, in addition to those already removed by the contractor. (Note: Tendron 2014, p. 21: Présentation générale des vestiges lapidaires) Octave de Rochebrune, however, indicates that Father de La Croix's excavations extracted 85 blocks in addition to those already removed by the contractor.) extracted and stored haphazardly in the presbytery garden, but no records or in situ drawings were made. (Note: The same criticism was directed at Father de La Croix when he undertook the excavation of the site of Sanxay in 1882.) However, Father de La Croix took approximately one hundred photos of the blocks once extracted, which are currently held in the departmental archives of Vienne. He also created numerous drawings, which appear to have been lost. In 1896, Charles Normand published a rough plan of the location of the remains based on de La Croix's indications. (Note: Tendron 2014, p. 6: Yzeures-sur-Creuse: une probable agglomération secondaire) Octave de Rochebrune, who examined the remains that year, attributed them to a temple he considered "the largest temple in Gaul." He proposed reconstructing the facade in a "classic" Roman temple with eight columns, with the sculpted stones serving as bases for some of the pronaos columns, and topped with a triangular pediment. (Note: Tendron 2014, p. 15: Histoire des découvertes: des sociétés savantes au xxie siècle) (Note: Adam & Jambon 1972, p. 101)

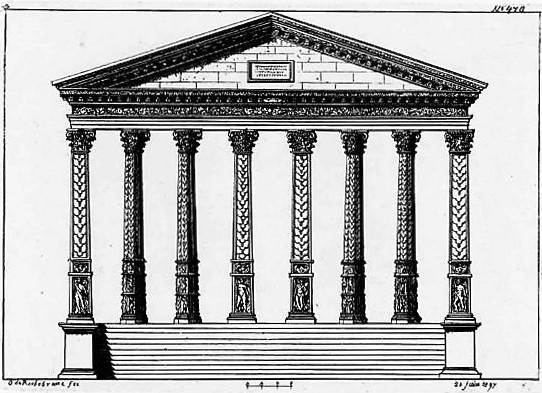
Artist's view of the Yzeures temple by Octave de Rochebrune

A controversy arose between Bosseboeuf and La Croix regarding their respective roles in the discovery and interpretation of the blocks, which were associated with several buildings, including a monumental pillar, a fanum-type temple with a polygonal cella, (Note: Temples of the fanum type with a polygonal cella are not the most common in France. However, they are represented in Poitou, particularly at Sanxay, where the temple cella has a regular octagon shape. The cella of the Yzeures temple might be more accurately described as an irregular polygon, similar to the temple of Trégouzel in Douarnenez. (Note: Tendron 2014, pp. 32–33: Un temple polygonal)) and an altar associated with one of the former. (Note: Adam & Jambon 1972, pp. 100–101) Three blocks (out of five probable ones) permitted the reconstruction of a monumental inscription (dedication to Minerva), which does not seem to relate to the pillar itself but more likely to the temple. (Note: Tendron 2010, p. 5: Découverte et historique des recherches) Father de La Croix provided a detailed account of his disagreements with the SAT in a memoir he sent in 1896 to several scientific authorities, including the Committee for Historic and Scientific Works. He asserted that he undertook the excavations only due to SAT's inaction. In contrast, the SAT stated that it intended to carry out the work and had allocated funds for this purpose. However, this was not possible due to an agreement between Father de La Croix and the municipality of Yzeures. Father de La Croix was repeatedly referred to as a "foreign archaeologist", alluding to his Belgian nationality.

In 1911, Émile Espérandieu photographed the blocks and published his photographs along with drawings he had made. The blocks were left in their original state, under a simple shelter, without further study or observation, until the late 1960s. It appears that about ten or twenty (depending on the initial count) of the blocks extracted by Father de La Croix have since been lost. These were likely large, undecorated brickwork, which, according to archaeologists and historians, reduces the archaeological significance of the loss. (Note: Tendron 2014, p. 22: Présentation générale des vestiges lapidaires)

=== First study of the pillar blocks during their relocation ===
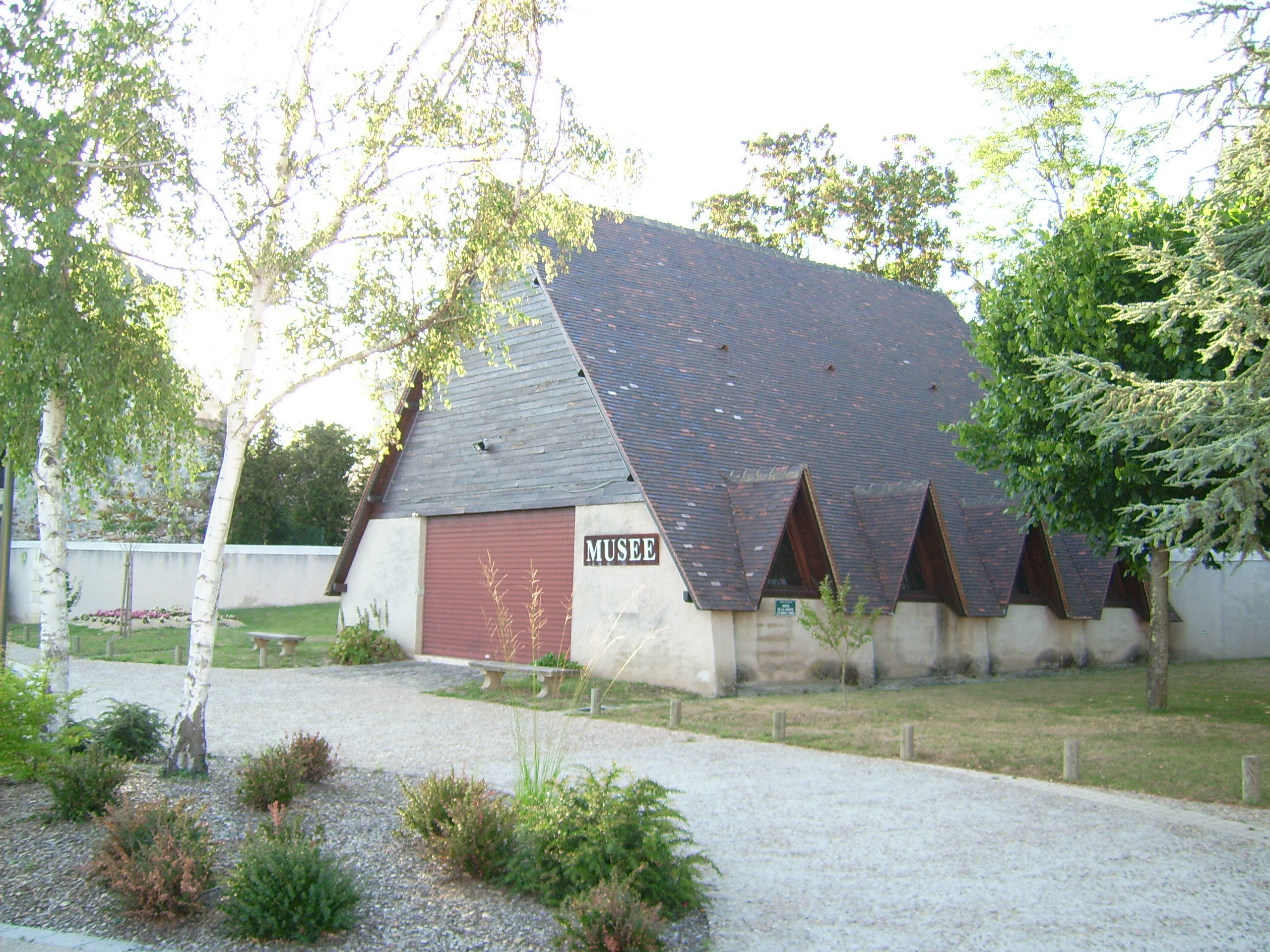
Minerve Museum

In 1970, the blocks had to be relocated due to a street that was going to be created along the south of the church nave. From 1970 to 1972, the remains attributed to the pillar were meticulously studied by archaeologist Jean-Pierre Adam, coinciding with the establishment of a local museum of ancient archaeology, founded in 1972 at the initiative of Gilbert Charles-Picard, with the intention of housing and showcasing them.

Until the 2010s, despite the lack of further in-depth studies of the blocks of Yzeures, several publications reiterated the results obtained by Adam.

=== Museum renovation and study of all lapidary deposits ===
The elements of the pillar, which were protected in 1896, have been included in the Palissy base since 1992. They are currently on display at the Minerva Museum in Yzeures-sur-Creuse, which was constructed near the garden where the blocks were stored after their discovery. (Note: Tendron 2010, p. 2: Introduction)

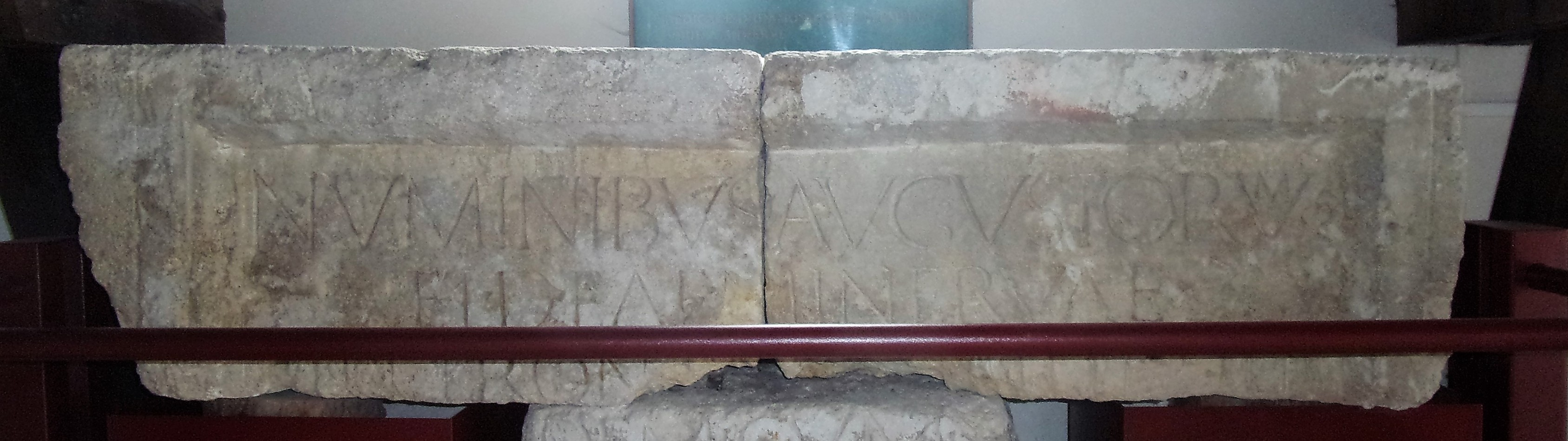
Dedication to Minerva (partial view), attributed to the temple at Yzeures-sur-Creuse

In 2014, a restoration of all the blocks on display at the museum was undertaken, accompanied by a meticulous study. It became evident that some blocks had been erroneously assembled in 1972 at the museum, which may have impeded their detailed examination. (Note: Tendron 2014, p. 29: Un temple polygonal) The investigations encompassed all the blocks in the Yzeures museum, including the pillar (21 or 25 blocks), temple (24 blocks), altar (2 blocks), and dedication (3 blocks). Thirteen large, undecorated blocks could not be associated with any of these monuments in the current state of knowledge. The results of these investigations suggest that the Yzeures monuments should be integrated into a secondary settlement. (Note: Tendron 2014: Les monuments romains d'Yzeures-sur-Creuse (37)) This aligns with recent investigations on the ancient site of Gué-de-Sciaux in Antigny, which are comparable in some aspects to Yzeures. (Note: Tendron 2014, p. 17: Histoire des découvertes: des sociétés savantes au xxie siècle) In addition, the museum's layout was revised to correct the block assembly errors, improve the presentation of the remains, and enhance visitor information.

=== Potential future discoveries ===
In 1895, the reconstruction of the Notre-Dame church was carried out without affecting the base of the north wall of the medieval nave, which was reused in the new building. (Note: Tendron 2014, p. 11: Histoire des découvertes: des sociétés savantes au xxie siècle) Given the lack of surveys that permit the precise location of the Merovingian church relative to later buildings, numerous historians hypothesize that in the intact foundations of this wall, which may overlap with that of the Merovingian church, other ancient blocks reused from the Yzeures monuments may be found. Some even suggest that only 50% of the blocks have been discovered.

== Description ==
=== General appearance of the monument ===
Among the numerous blocks unearthed during the excavation, 21 have been identified as belonging to a monumental column or pillar.

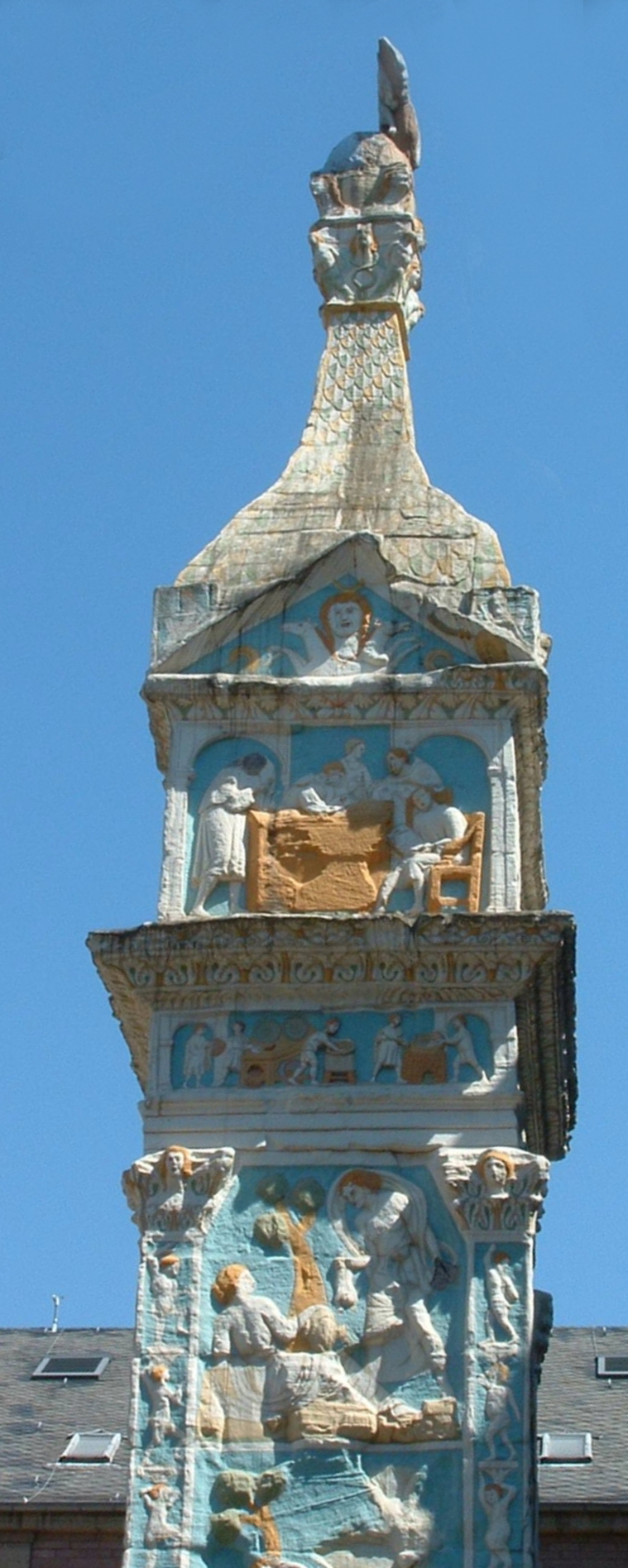
Color copy of the Igel mausoleum

However, Louis-Auguste Bosseboeuf and Octave de Rochebrune do not mention the hypothesis of a pillar and attribute all the sculpted blocks to the temple. Émile Espérandieu correctly identifies a pillar, but in 1912, in the Revue archéologique and on a suggestion by Franz Cumont, proposes a reconstruction that is not considered very credible by Henry Auvray in the 1930s. This hypothesis is distinct from that proposed by Jean-Pierre Adam. Adam's reconstruction, proposed in 1972, is more aligned with the available evidence and suggests that the column, estimated to be nine meters high, consists of a bare base, three tiers of sculpted blocks with successive setbacks, and is topped by a now-missing monumental statue. This interpretation concludes that the pillar takes the form of a very elongated step pyramid. (Note: Tendron 2010, p. 6: Le "pilier d'Yzeures-sur-Creuse" ou pilier votif à Jupiter) The stylistic differences between the various levels of decoration indicate that multiple sculpting workshops were simultaneously producing the pillar's different tiers.

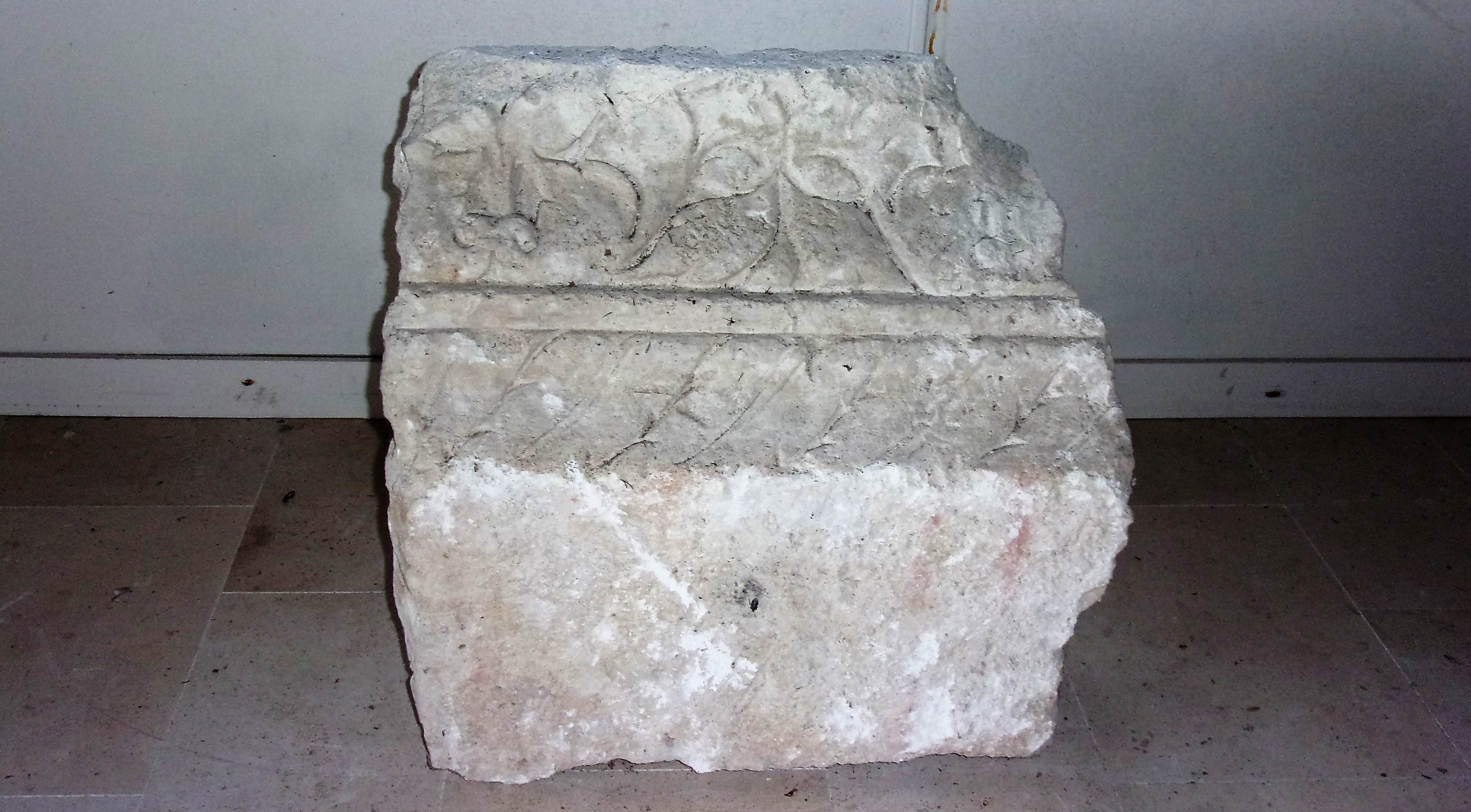
Potential element of a pillar cornice

The transition from one tier of decorated blocks to another may be marked by cornices, decorated or plain, as observed in similar monuments. Four sculpted elements could be attributed to one such cornice, resulting in 25 preserved elements of the pillar. (Note: Tendron 2010, p. 49: Complément à la restitution du pilier) In addition to their aesthetic value, these cornices protect the blocks immediately below from rainwater runoff. (Note: Tendron 2014, p. 37: Un temple polygonal)

The rock used, homogeneous from one block to the next, is a locally extracted Rauracian (Upper Jurassic) oolitic limestone of such hardness that some inclusions (fossils, flint nodules) remained in place, in relief, within the sculptures. Similar rock quarries, used for making Merovingian sarcophagi, exist in Angles-sur-l'Anglin or near Saint-Pierre-de-Maillé. (Note: Adam & Jambon 1972, p. 100) The relatively poor quality of the base material needed to apply a lime wash to the monument's faces for leveling purposes. (Note: Tendron 2014, p. 51: Pierre et polychromie) The paint traces observed on the pillar indicate the presence of a polychrome decoration, comparable to that of the Igel mausoleum. A painted replica of this pillar, based on the original's remains, is on display at the Rheinisches Landesmuseum Trier.

=== Iconography of the decor ===
==== Base: Layers of bare stone ====
The proposed reconstruction by Jean-Pierre Adam depicts a base comprising four layers of non-sculpted blocks, constructed with successive setbacks in a square plan and reaching a total height of about 1.70 meters. Among the thirteen non-sculpted blocks that have been preserved, none can be definitively attributed to this base.

==== First level: Four major deities ====
The initial level of sculptures is square in plan, measuring 1.73 meters on each side and reaching a height of 1.85 meters (the only level whose height can be confirmed with certainty). Twelve identified blocks are attached to this level. It comprises three layers of superimposed blocks. (Note: Tendron 2014, p. 52: Premier niveau: "une gigantesque pierre à quatre dieux") Each face is decorated with pilasters bearing scrollwork. This level depicts four deities, one on each face. (Note: Tendron 2010, p. 8: Description du premier niveau: "une gigantesque pierre à quatre dieux")

The first level of sculpture depicts four Roman deities: Jupiter, Vulcan, Mars, and Apollo. Jupiter is depicted as a god of thunder, holding a thunderbolt. Vulcan is shown with his anvil and tongs, although the face is not preserved. (Note: Adam & Jambon 1972, p. 104) Mars is helmeted and armed in a style reminiscent of Lysippos' statues. (Note: Adam & Jambon 1972, p. 105) Apollo is shown with musical instruments, including a cithara and plectrum, and accompanied by a griffin. These four deities might symbolize the victorious emperor in a coherent set with its symbolism, which could be called the "four-god stone". This is also the most immediately visible level for the observer, as it is at eye level. (Note: Tendron 2010, p. 9: Description du premier niveau sculpté: "une gigantesque pierre à quatre dieux")

First-level blocks

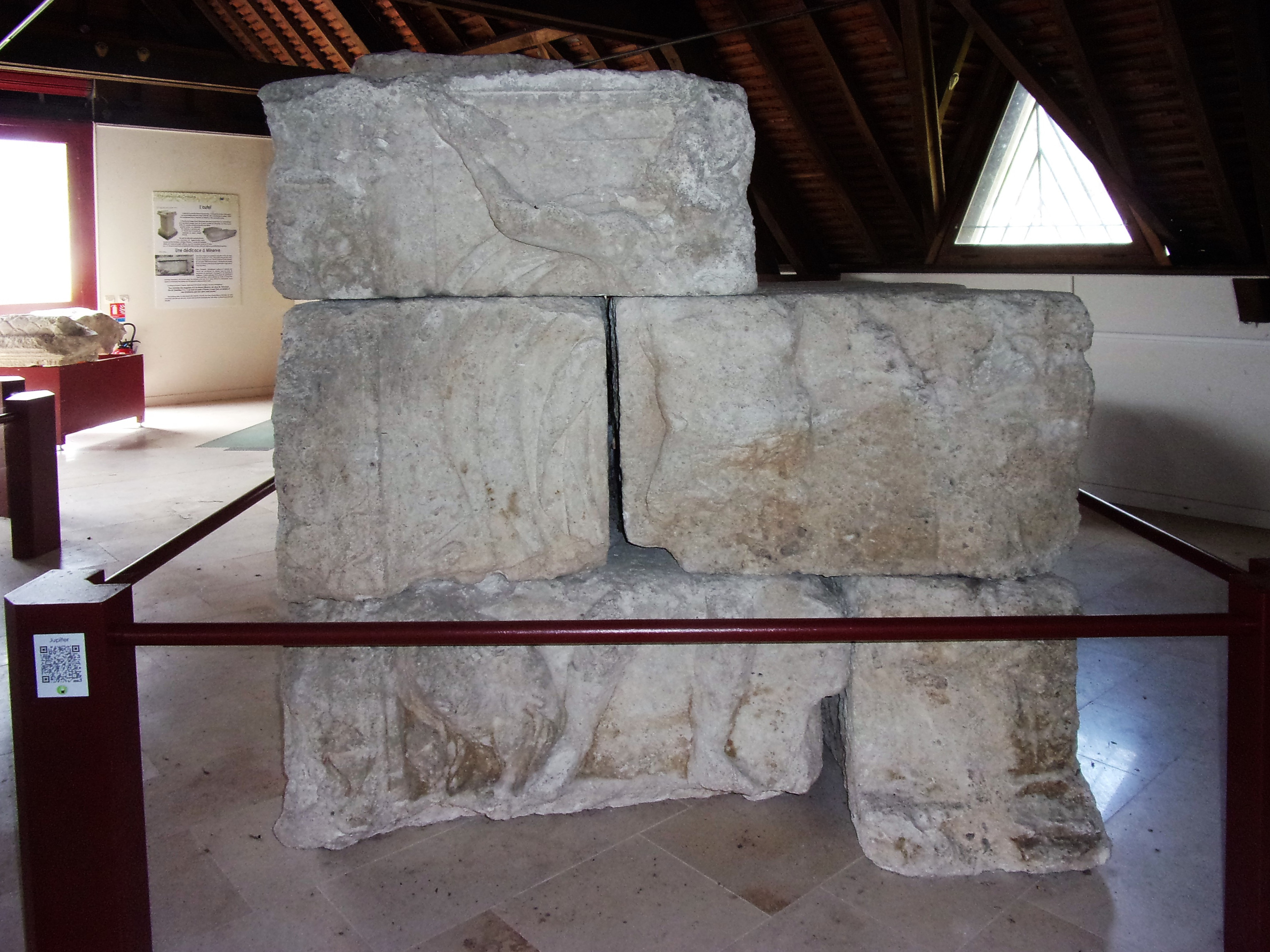
Jupiter

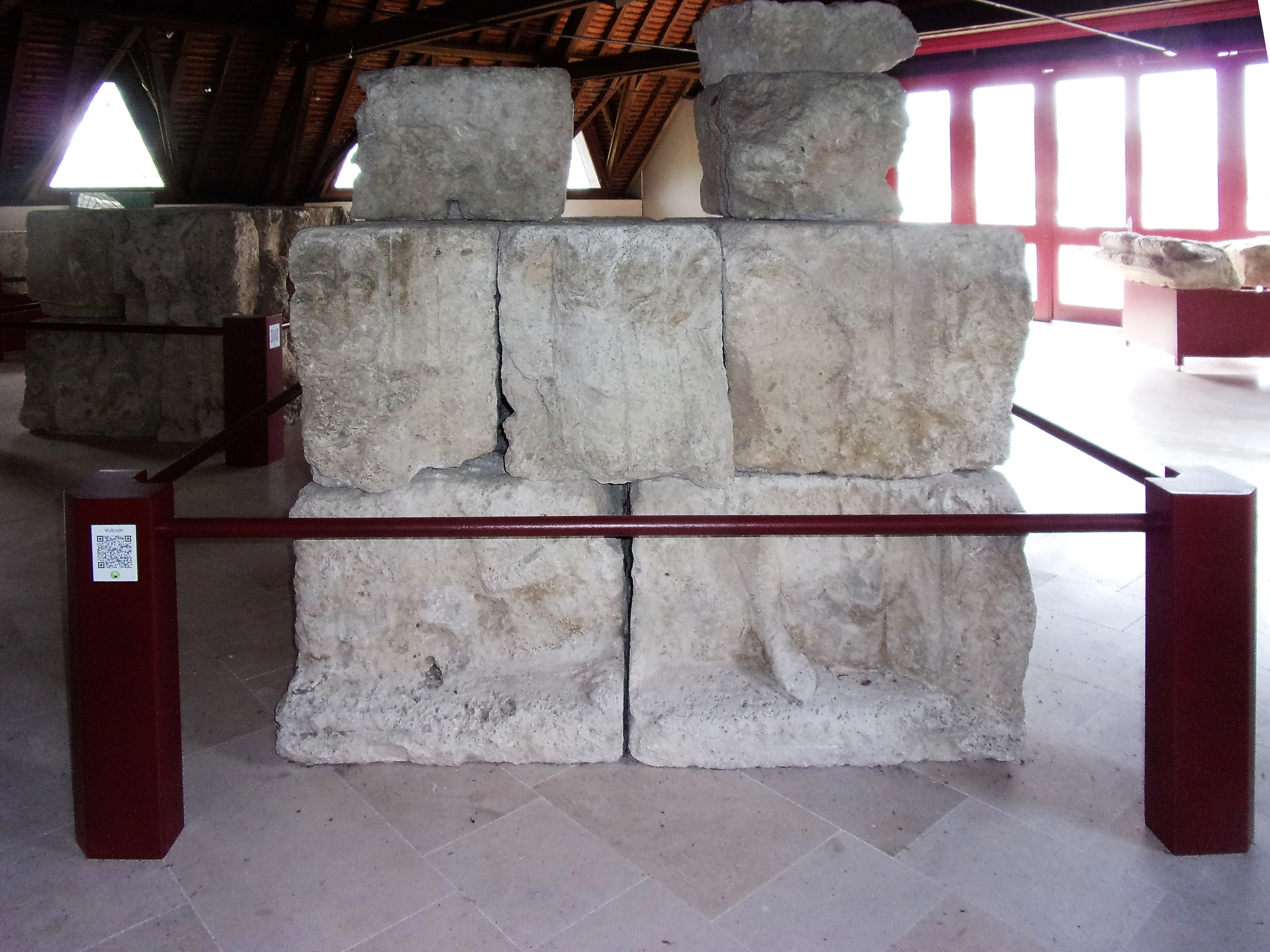
Vulcan

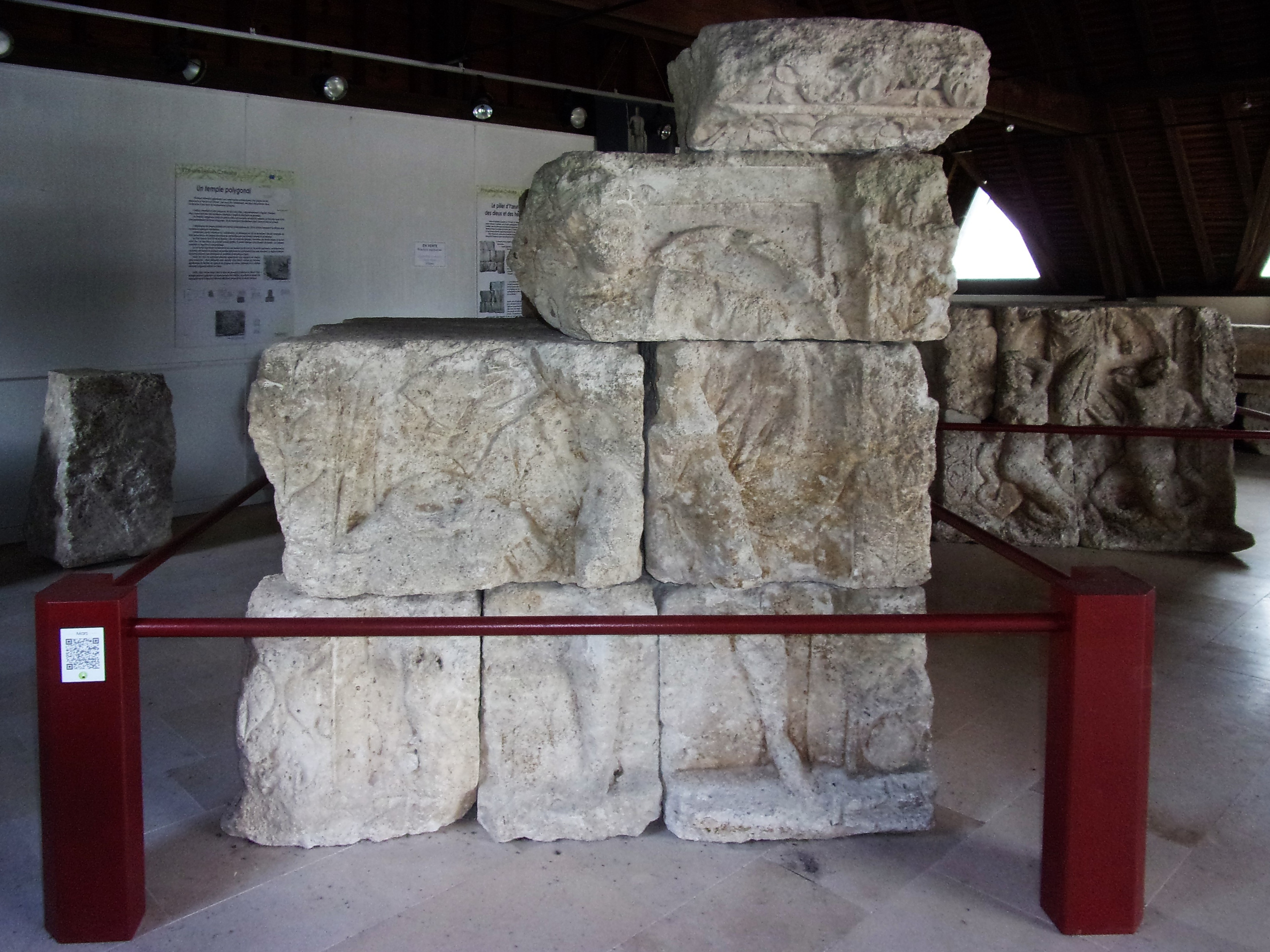
Mars

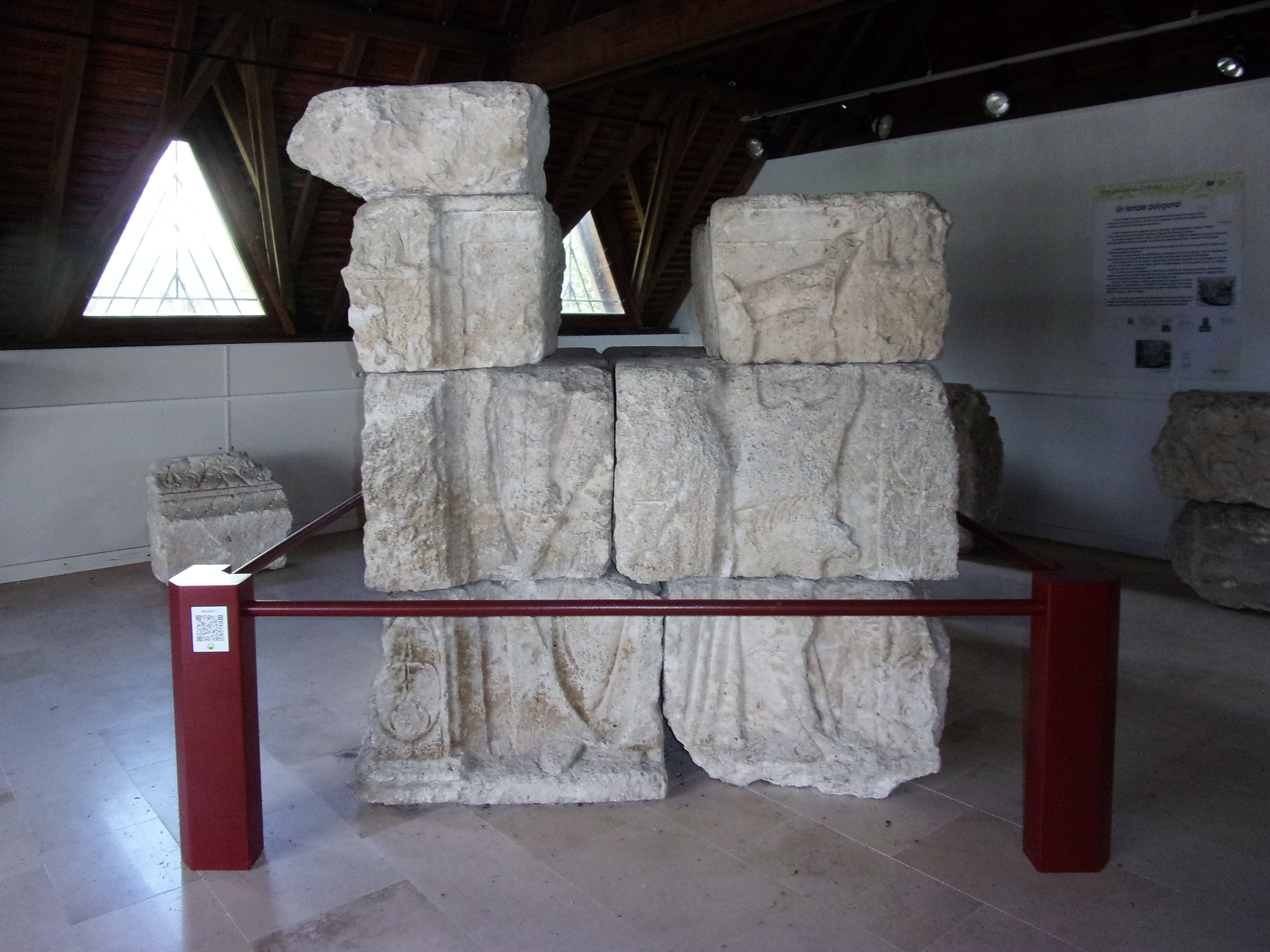
Apollo

==== Second level: Heroic battles of Olympus ====
This tier also has a square base, but it is smaller than the first (measuring 1.42 meters per side). Only two of the original three layers of blocks remain; the upper parts of each face are missing, making it impossible to determine the exact height. Seven blocks are known. (Note: Tendron 2014, p. 56: Deuxième niveau sculpté: "cycles héroïques et épisodes des grandes luttes de l'Olympe") Like the first tier, pilasters mark each corner. (Note: Tendron 2010, p. 10: Description du deuxième niveau sculpté: "cycles héroïques et épisodes des grandes luttes de l'Olympe") The relief of the sculptures is more pronounced than on the lower tier, which may be intended to facilitate the reading of the motifs, given that they are at a higher level and farther from the observer's eye. (Note: Adam & Jambon 1972, p. 103)

The sculptures are dedicated to heroic traditions and battles on Olympus: Hercules rescuing Hesione from a sea monster, Perseus rescuing Andromeda by attacking a serpent-like monster, and Mars and Minerva in separate "tables" fighting the Anguipede giants for control of Olympus. (Note: Tendron 2010, pp. 10–11: Description du deuxième niveau sculpté: "cycles héroïques et épisodes des grandes luttes de l'Olympe") The 1972 study suggests that these scenes are an allegory of the victorious Roman legion serving the emperor.

Second level blocks

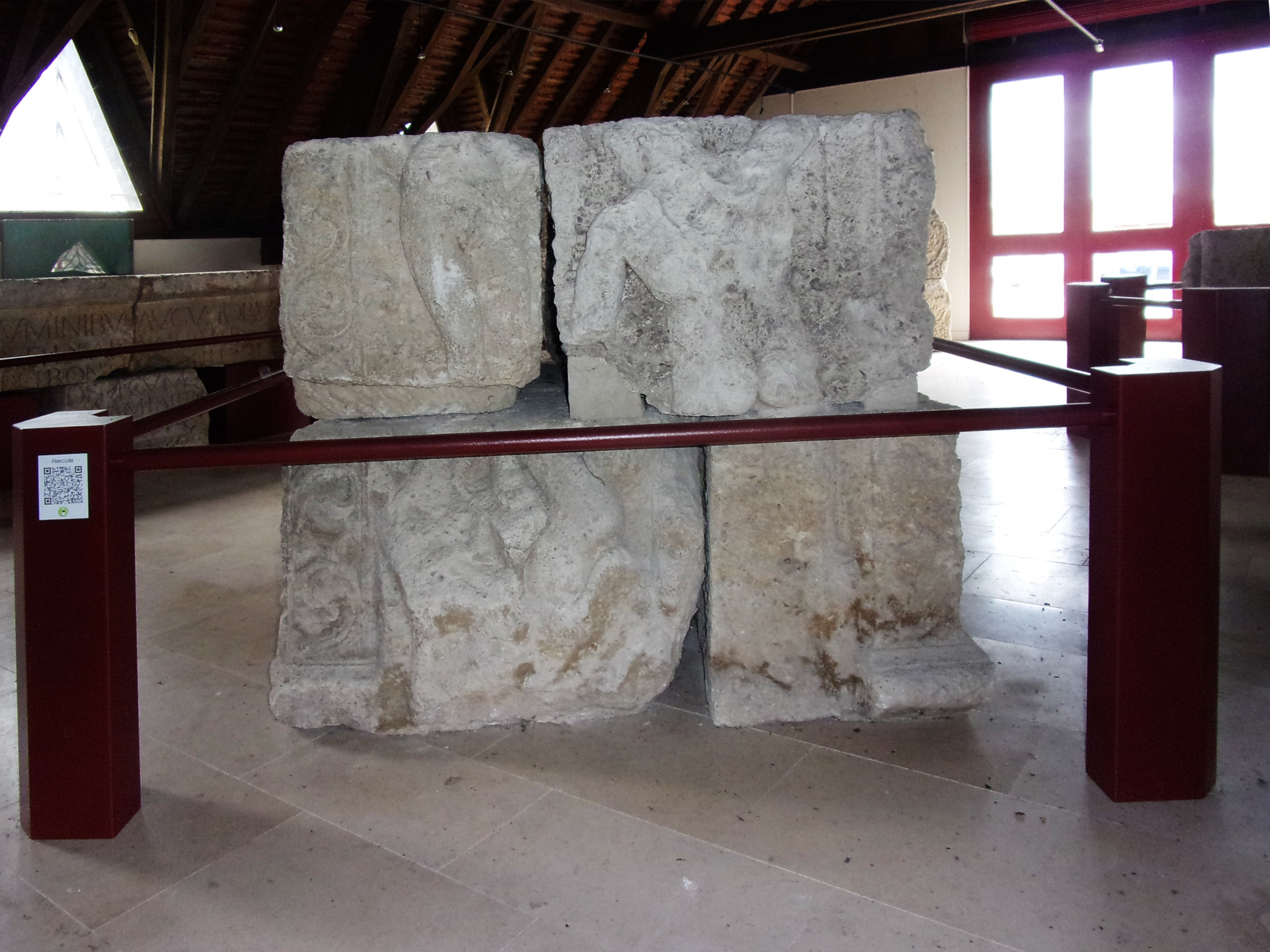
Hercules rescuing Hésione

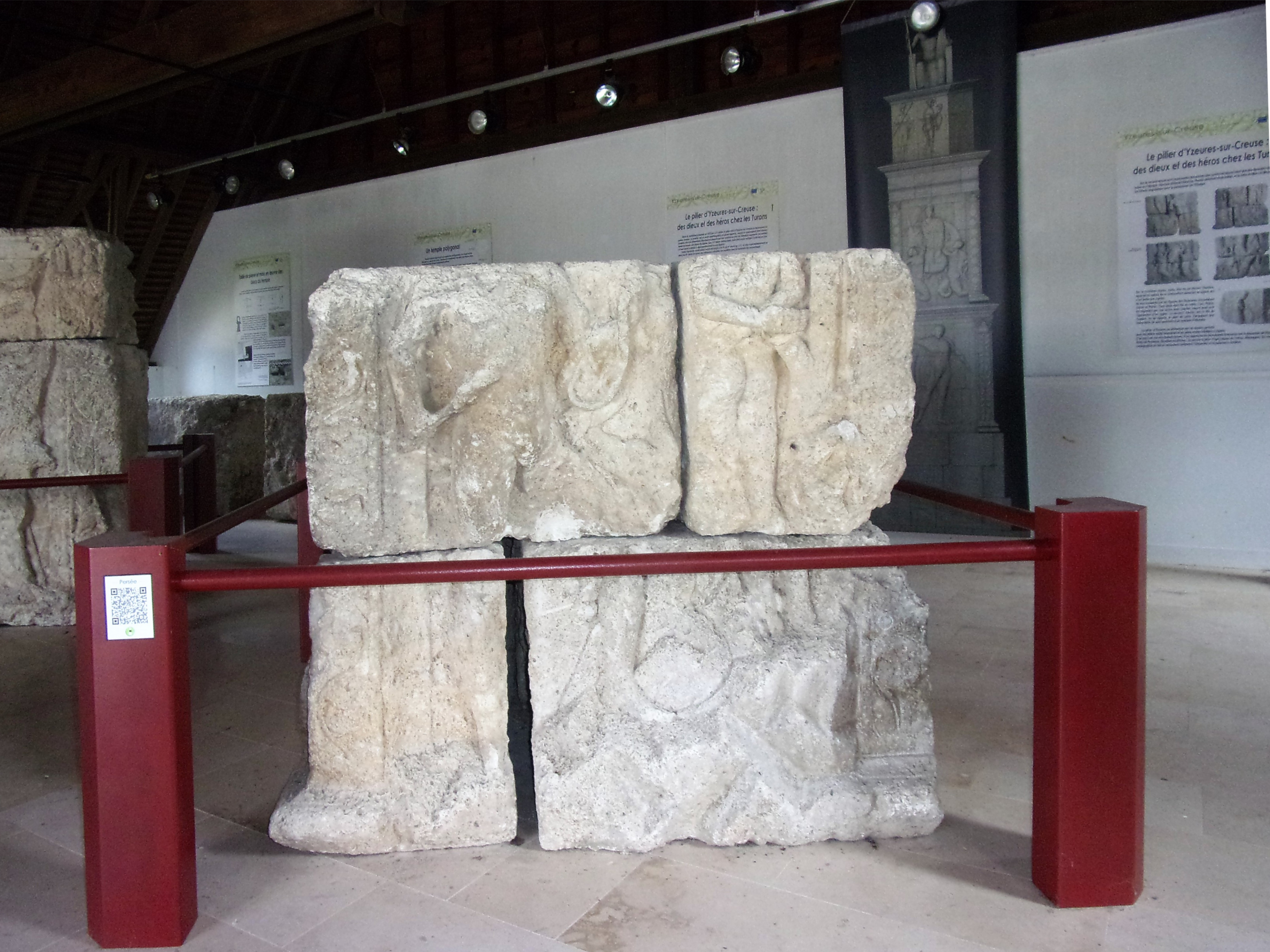
Perseus rescuing Andromeda

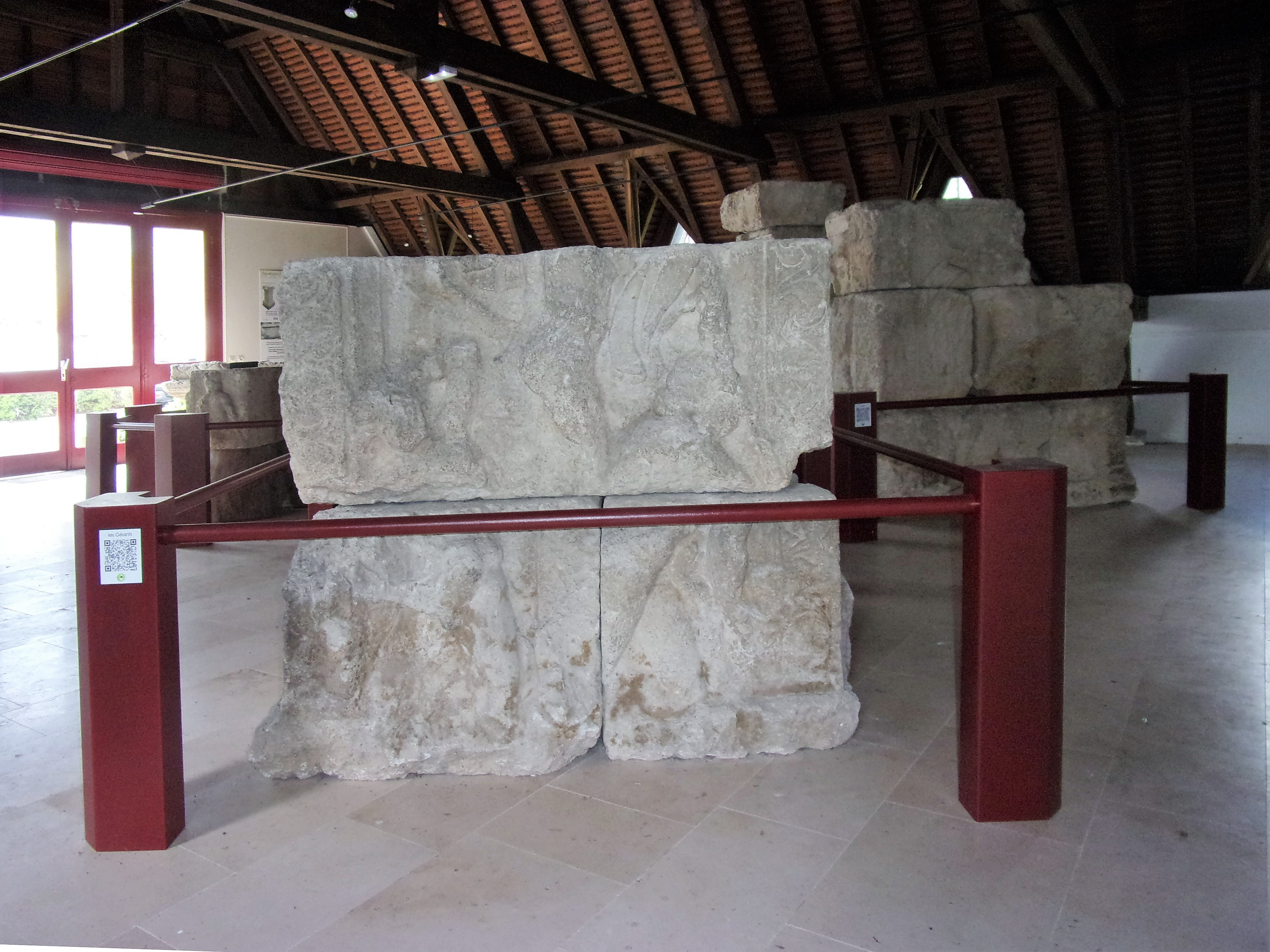
Mars fighting the giant Anguipedes

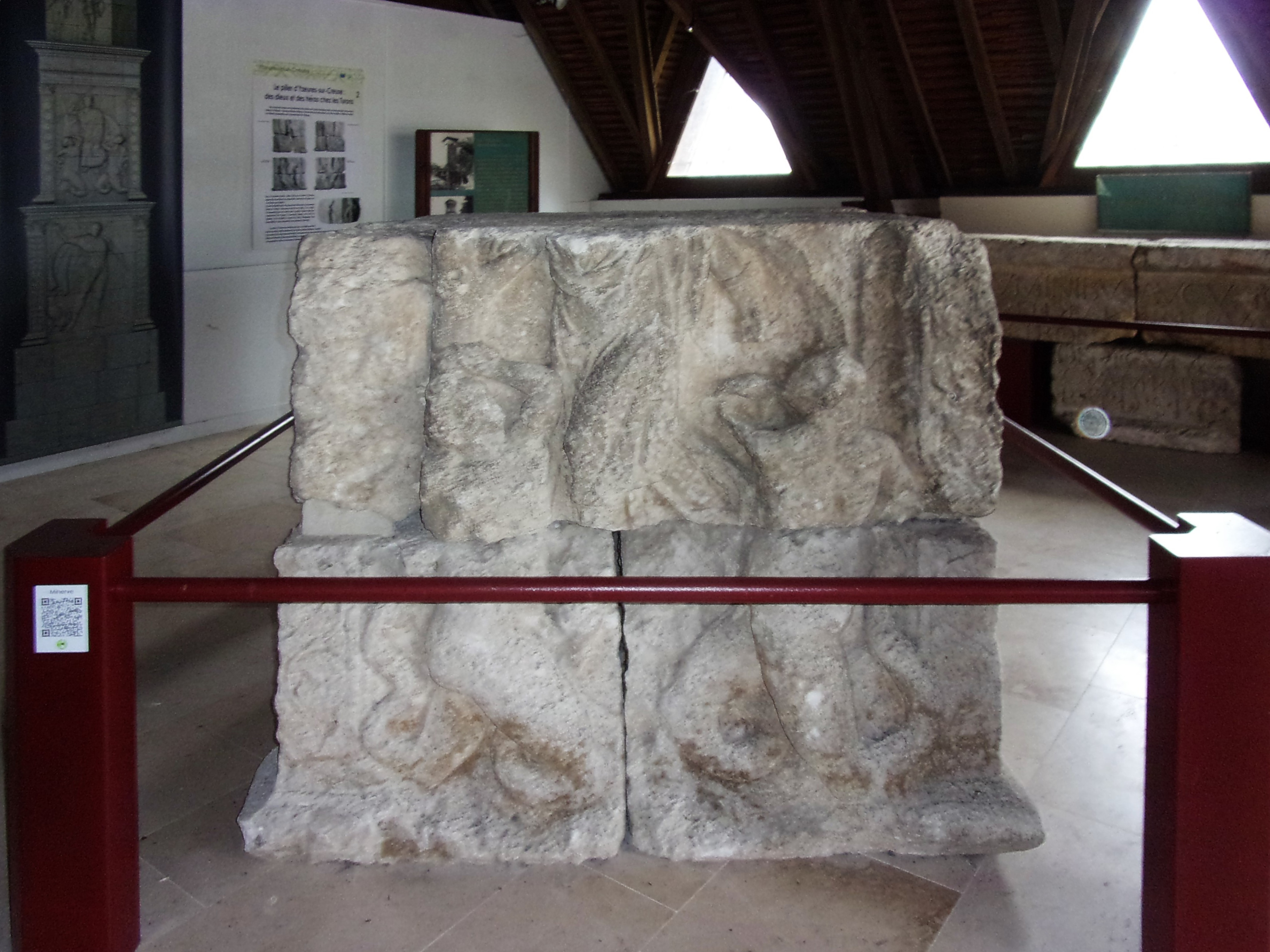
Minerva fighting the giant Anguipedes

==== Third level: An incomplete frieze ====
This level of the sculptures is the least well-preserved, with only two blocks identified. It has an octagonal plan and its dimensions, smaller than those of the other levels, cannot be precisely defined. Three of the octagon's eight faces are missing and cannot be reconstructed, and the lower-tier blocks are completely absent. However, it seems that the different scenes depicted complement each other and that the entire level forms a single frieze. (Note: Tendron 2010, p. 12: Description du troisième niveau) This may be why the various scenes are not separated by pilasters, in contrast to the lower levels. (Note: Tendron 2014, p. 60: Troisième niveau sculpté: Léda et les Dioscures) The sculptures exhibit even more pronounced relief than on the second level, to ensure optimal visibility.

Only four characters are identifiable: Leda, accompanied by the swan whose form Jupiter has taken, Castor and Pollux, and Neptune with his trident (In Gaul, Neptune was also the god of rivers and springs (Note: Adam & Jambon 1972, p. 106)). It is also possible that a fifth character might be a dancer with crossed legs. This ensemble, on which some traces of polychrome paint are discernible, (Note: The red paint traces applied to the engravings of the letters in the "dedication to Minerva" have also been preserved. (Note: Tendron 2014, p. 25: Un temple polygonal)) is preserved by the relief of the sculptures. However, it is too incompletely preserved for an overall interpretation.

Third-level blocks

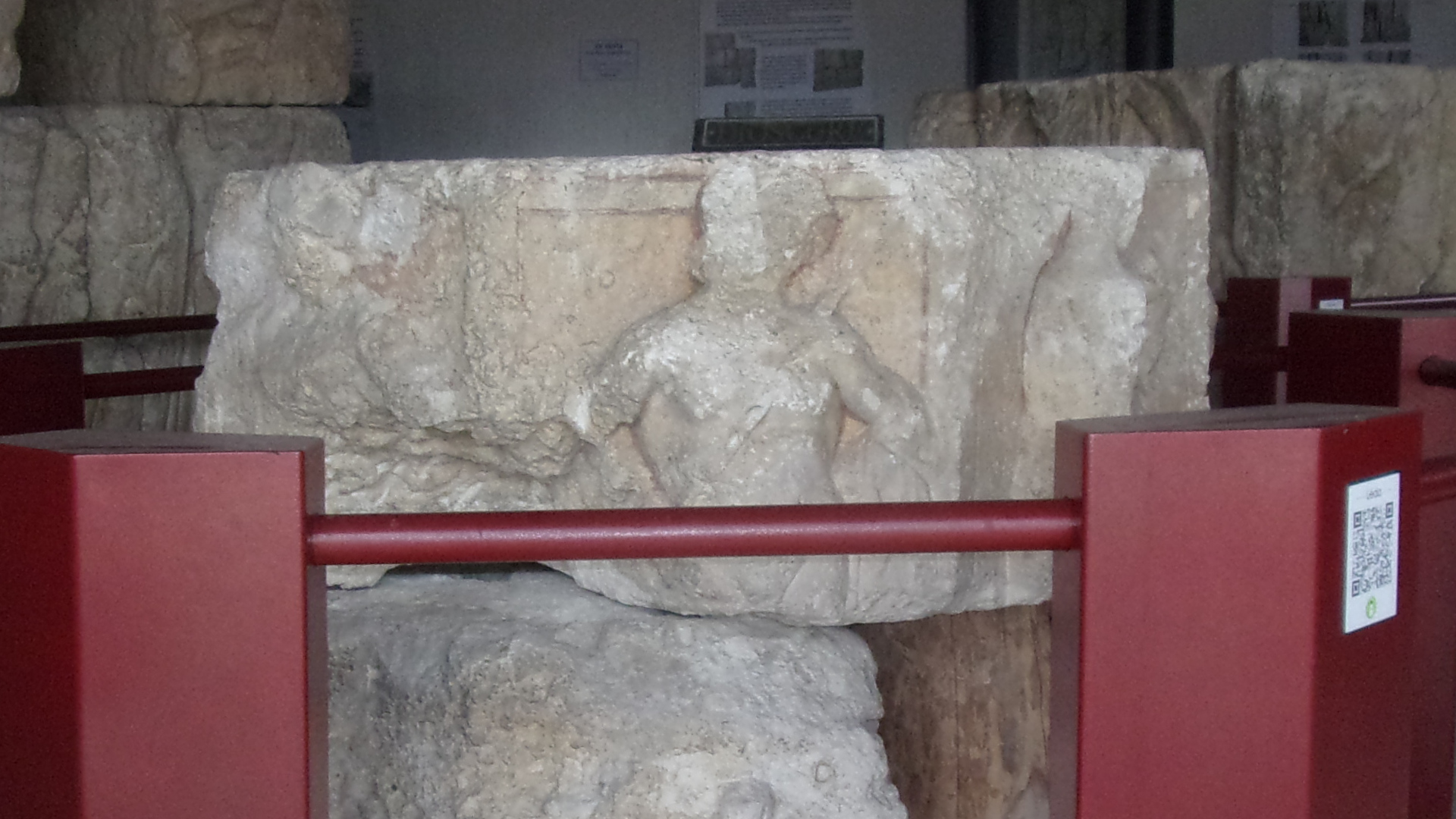
Castor

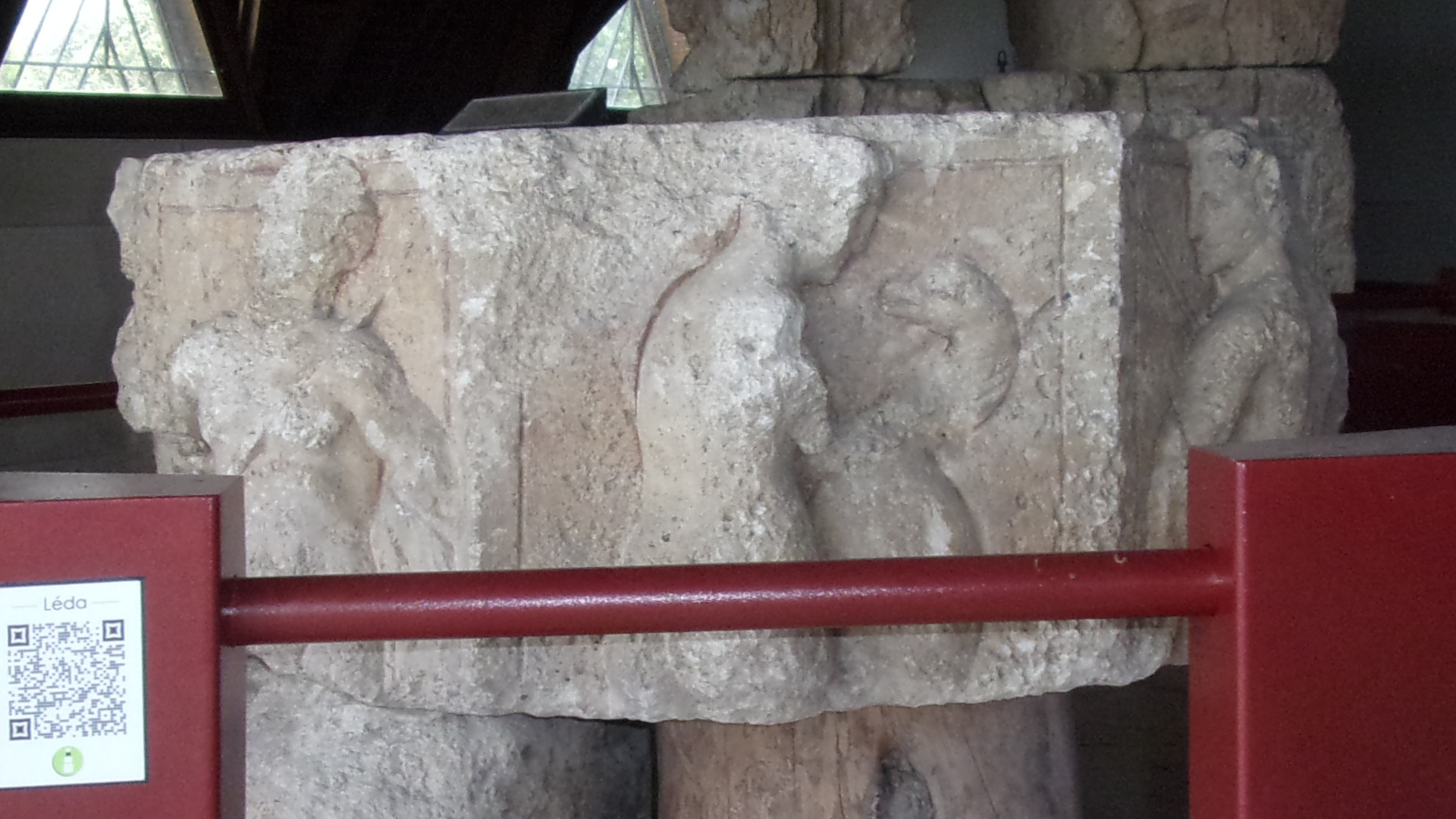
Leda and the swan

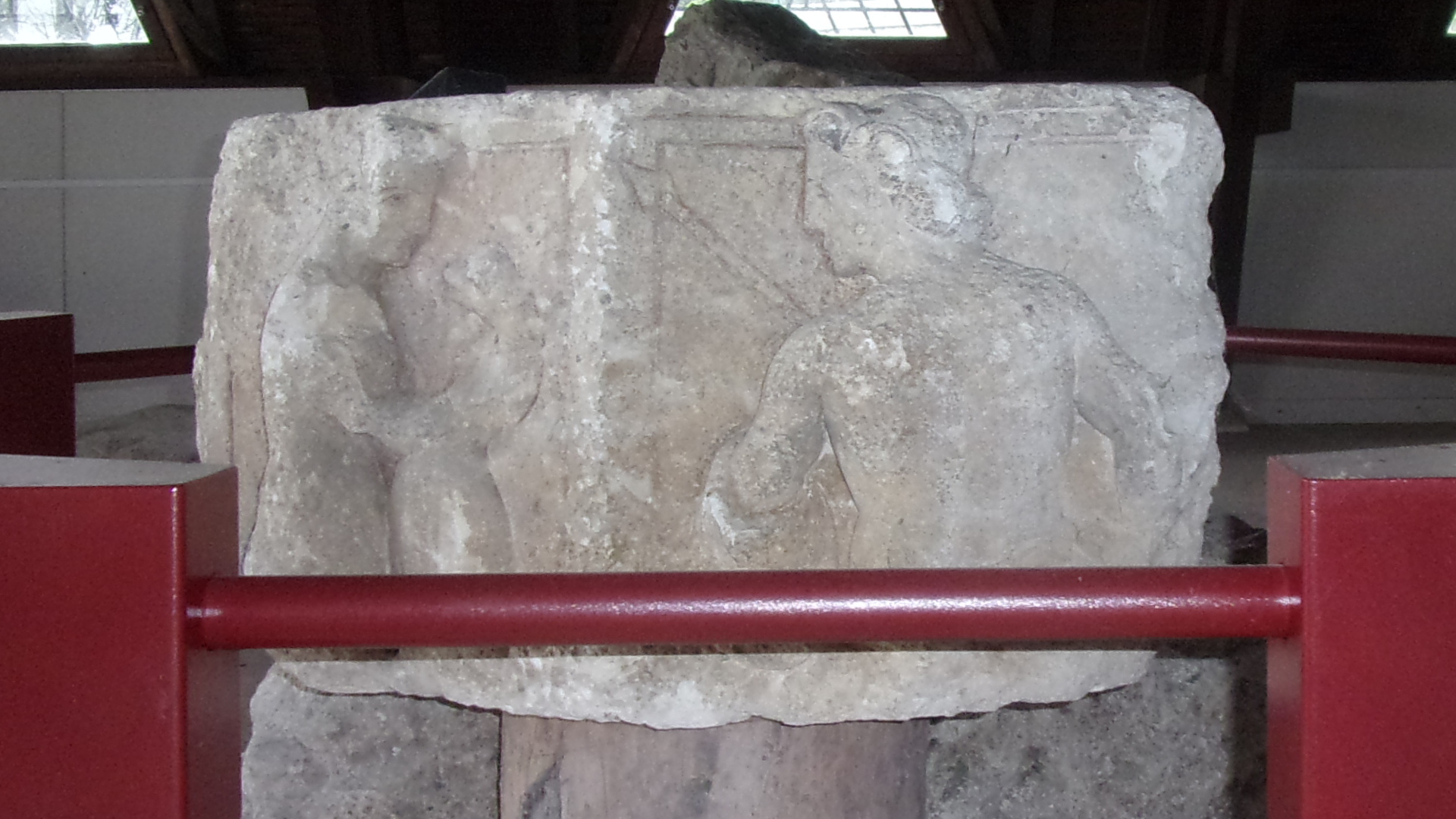
Pollux

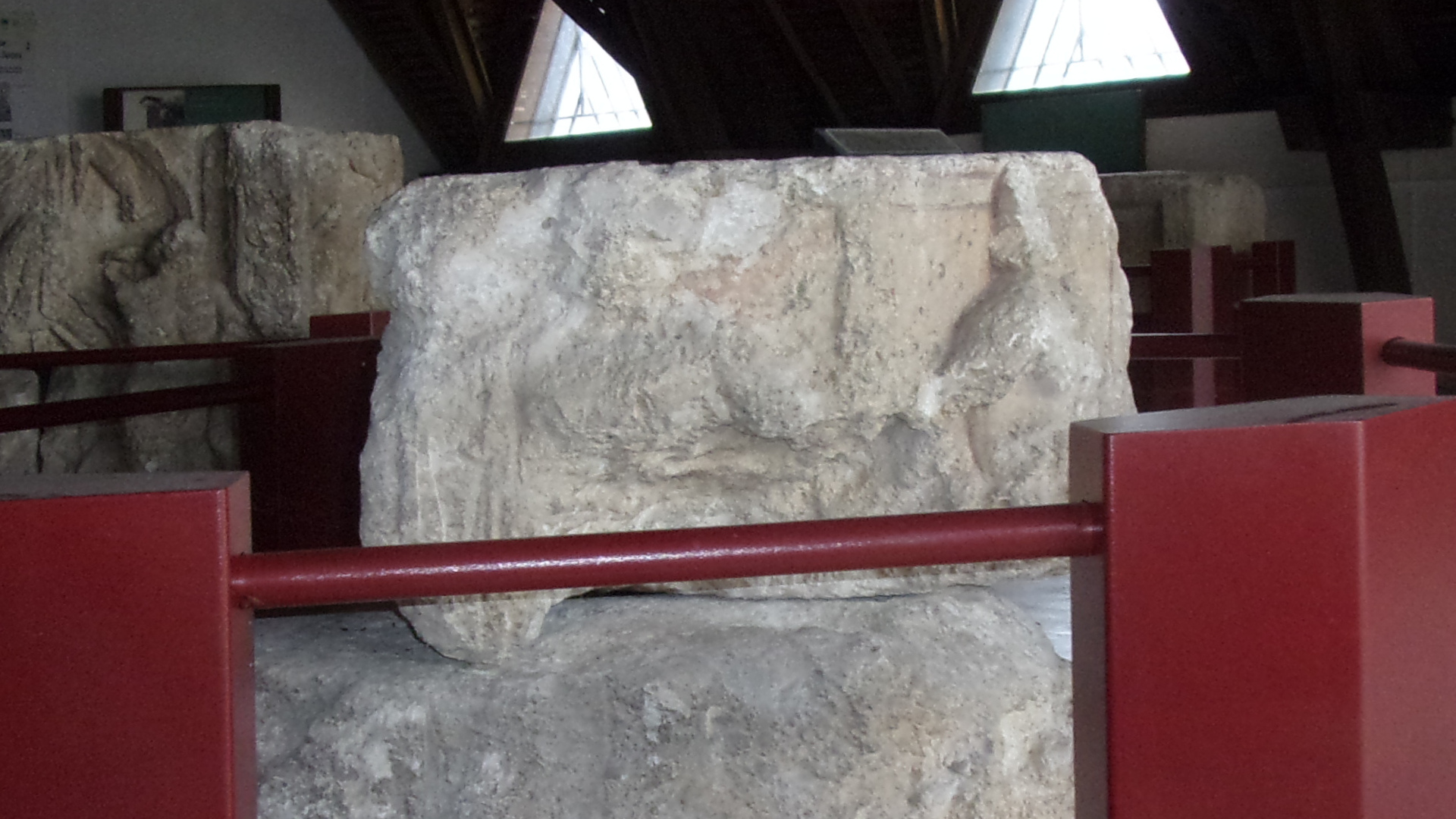
Neptune

==== Crowning: A missing statue ====
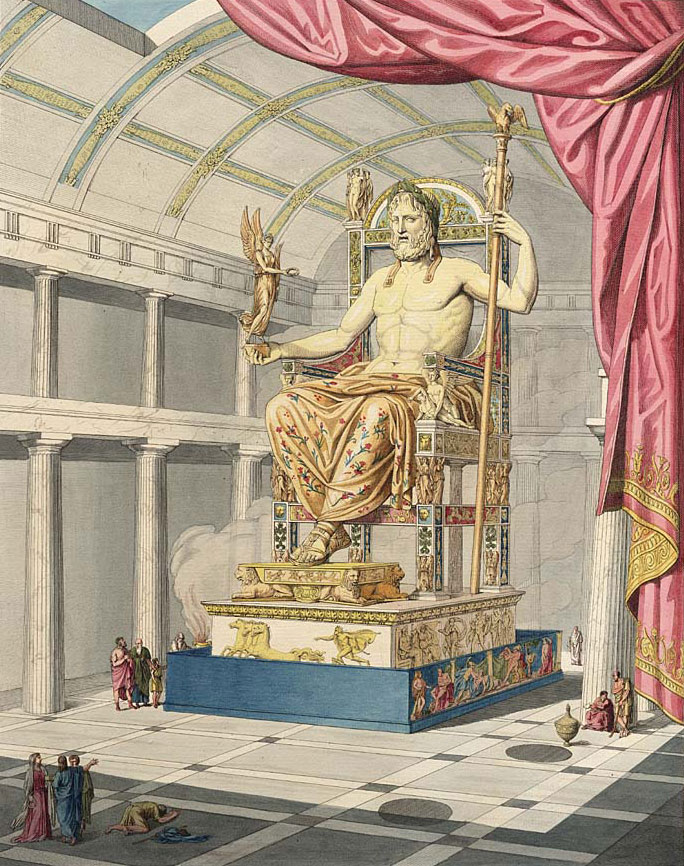
Figure of the statue of Zeus at Olympia

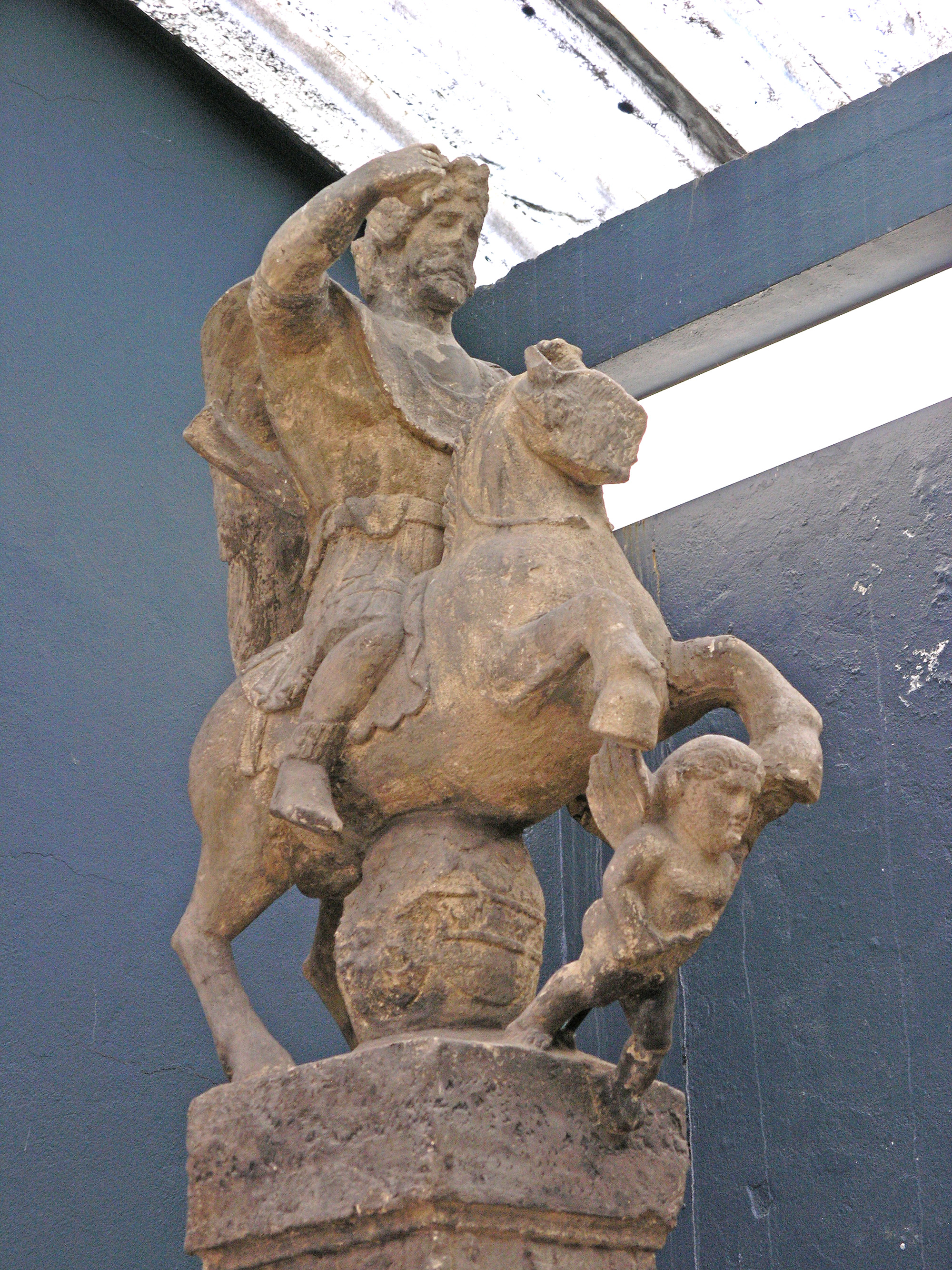
Jupiter rider with Anguiped (Musée Lorrain, Nancy)

The existence of a summit statue is highly probable, although it has not been discovered. Most similar monuments are likely to have had such statues, although few remnants can be found to attest to this. The general architecture of the pillar (tiers with successive setbacks up to the top) suggests that the summit statue was a major element of the monument.

The statue may represent Jupiter, who may be depicted seated on his throne, as with the chryselephantine statue of Zeus at Olympia, one of the Seven Wonders of the Ancient World. Alternatively, the god could be depicted in another posture, such as standing or on horseback, engaged in combat, accompanied by a prisoner or an Anguipede, as proposed by Gilbert Charles-Picard. (Note: Tendron 2010, p. 14: La double parenté du monument d'Yzeures) In 1912, Émile Espérandieu proposed that his reconstruction of the Yzeures column be topped by a statue of Jupiter on horseback defeating the Anguipede, symbolizing the emperor's victory over Rome's enemies. Gérard Coulon suggests that this representation might symbolize eternity, with death depicted as the defeated monster.

Other subjects for this statue include Minerva, who seems significant in Yzeures as she is mentioned in the epigraphy (Note: Tendron 2014, p. 27: Une dédicace à Minerve) found with the pillar remains and appears on the pillar itself. Alternatively, the emperor, whether endowed with the attributes of the god of gods or not, could be the subject of the statue.

However, in the absence of remains of the statue and a dedicatory inscription for the pillar itself, no hypothesis can be favored.

== Interpretation and function ==
=== Monument from the early 3rd century ===
The theme, the style of the sculptures, with notable Oriental influences in the representation of characters on the first two tiers, and the monument size collectively suggest a dating to the early 3rd century. The discovery of four coins of Domitian (emperor at the end of the 1st century) on the excavation site, not grouped in a single deposit, does not contradict such a date. This element, which serves as a terminus post quem, is not an indicator of precise dating, as the coins found likely continued to circulate long after Domitian's death. The discovery of a coin featuring Julia Mamaea (wife of Septimius Severus, late 2nd and early 3rd centuries) is particularly challenging to interpret, as the location of its discovery in Yzeures is not specified. The dedication to Minerva, likely not linked to the pillar, is dated to the 2nd and 3rd centuries and exhibits technical similarities (same type of rock, painted decoration).

=== Votive pillar to Jupiter and the Emperor ===
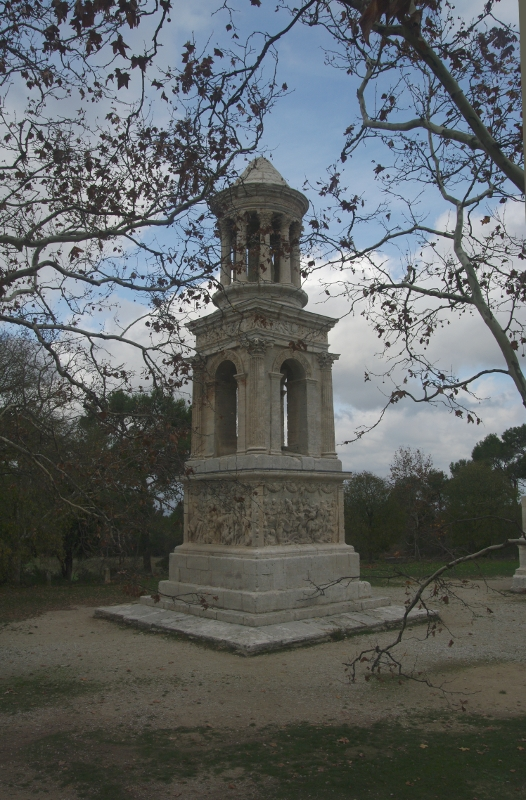
Mausoleum of Glanum

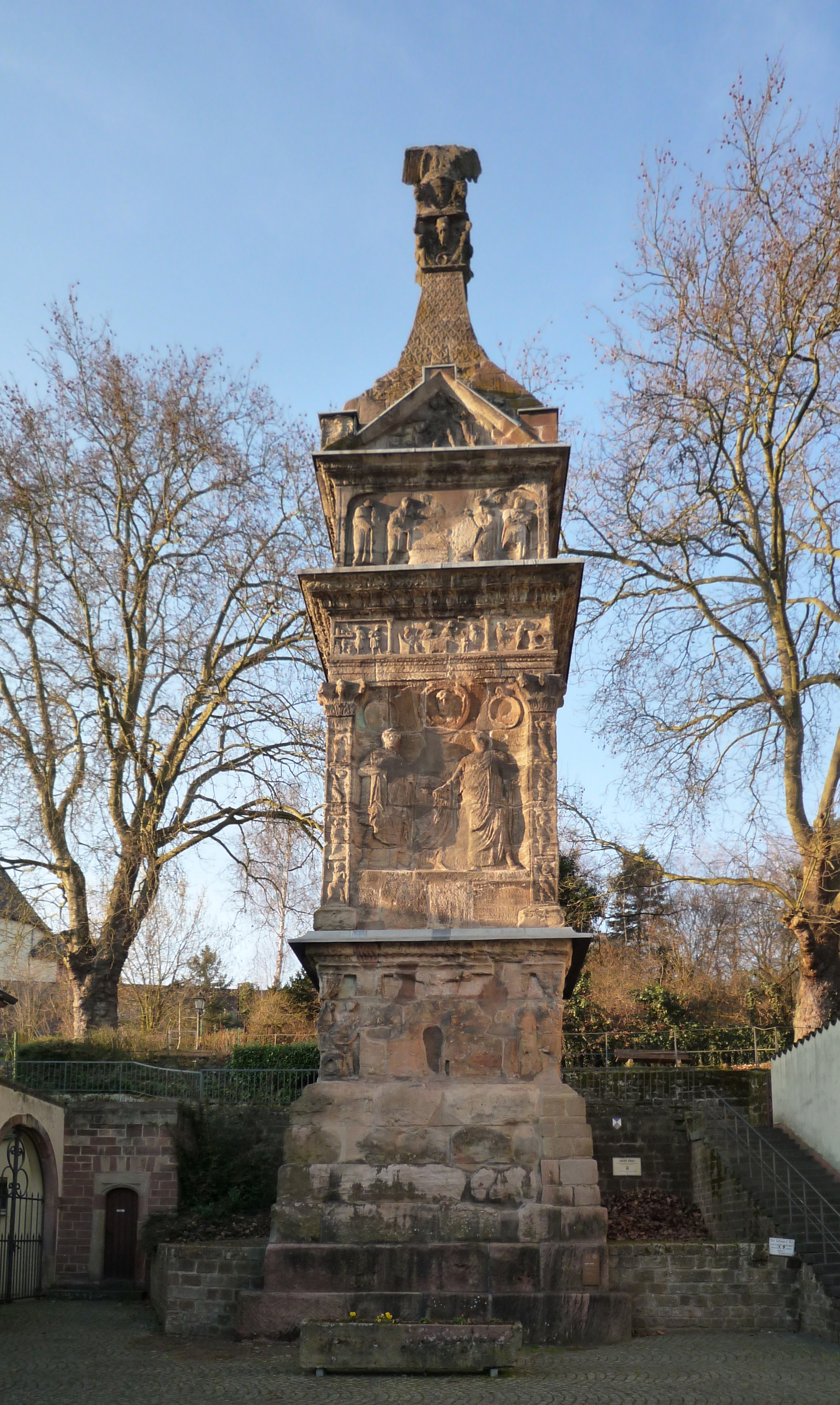
Igel Column

The pillar at Yzeures-sur-Creuse appears to exhibit a pronounced structural parallelism with votive funerary pillars such as the mausoleum of Glanum (dated to the Augustan era) or that at Igel (constructed in the early 3rd century, contemporaneous with the Pillar of Yzeures), which influenced Jean-Pierre Adam's reconstruction. (Note: Tendron 2010, p. 13: La double parenté du monument d'Yzeures) (Note: Adam & Jambon 1972, p. 102) A comparison can also be made between the Pillar of Yzeures and other similar monuments, such as the Pillar of the Nautes and the Pillar of Saint-Landry in Paris. However, its function appears to be different since its decoration represents only gods or mythological heroes, in contrast to the sites at Glanum or Igel, where some sculptures depict secular scenes or representations of the deceased. The Yzeures pillar differs from the Pillar of the Nautes in that no Gallic deities are represented. Additionally, archaeologists and historians have noted that Mercury does not seem to be represented at Yzeures.

The decorative elements allow the restored monument to be interpreted as a votive column to Jupiter, which would be a symbolic homage to the emperor through the allegories depicted in the scenes and characters. One of the functions of this pillar is likely to remind the conquered peoples of the imperial role and power, inscribed in permanence as suggested by the evocations of the Dioscuri and the swan of Leda, symbols of eternity. (Note: Tendron 2014, p. 61: Troisième niveau sculpté: Léda et les Dioscures) The themes and techniques employed in the creation of this pillar demonstrate that, even in the third century, the influence of Greco-Roman sculptural art remained pervasive, even though the depictions of Anguipedes are primarily Gallo-Roman creations.

Sculpted blocks discovered at Ernodurum (Saint-Ambroix – Cher) and at Antigny (Vienne) have been identified as reused in the foundations of Merovingian buildings. They exhibit a similar iconographic symbolism to the Yzeures pillar, particularly on the second level.

=== Cult center within an undiscovered secondary settlement ===
Yzeures-sur-Creuse in the civitas of the Turones (in red)

Combining sacred and profane symbolism, the pillar is most probably part of the monumental adornment of an important ancient cult center, which also included at least one temple and an altar. This cult center was abandoned and then dismantled, perhaps several decades later. It was succeeded by a Christian foundation around the mid-5th century during Eustochius' episcopate, as mentioned by Gregory of Tours. The continued religious function of the site after the fall of the Roman Empire, evidenced by the reuse of monument remnants, attests to its importance. The Christian builders likely intended to "purify" this pagan site by constructing a church. The use of the blocks served a dual purpose: providing solid construction material and, by burying them in the foundations, removing them from view to make people forget the cult they represented. At about the same time, Valentinian III, the emperor of Rome from 424 to 455, ordered the destruction of pagan symbols to replace them with churches.

Nevertheless, no archaeological evidence allows for the precise location or extent of this cult center to be determined, nor for the consideration of other accompanying structures. The only remnants found are reused materials. (Note: Tendron 2014, p. 7: Yzeures-sur-Creuse: une probable agglomération secondaire) (Note: Before the excavation ended, Father de La Croix wrote that he had identified the temple location, yet he could not continue his work and did not specify this location in his current notes.) About fifteen ancient sites, including at least three Gallo-Roman villas, have been identified in the territory of Yzeures-sur-Creuse. This territory was, in antiquity, at the border of the territories of the Bituriges Cubi, the Pictones, and the Turones.

The hypothesis of a secondary settlement linked to this cult center is highly plausible, despite the lack of formal confirmation based on the available evidence. An ancient ford on the Creuse is attested at Yzeures, but the veracity of old mentions of ancient roads serving this territory, such as one connecting Avaricum (Bourges) to Limonum (Poitiers), has not been substantiated.

The sites of Yzeures-sur-Creuse and Gué-de-Sciaux at Antigny have some similarities. Both are potential secondary settlements near a watercourse that could facilitate the transport of goods. Both have a ford and are near the border of several territories. Furthermore, both are likely to have been endowed with an important cult center. (Note: Tendron 2014, p. 67: D'Yzeures-sur-Creuse au Gué-de-Sciaux (Antigny)) This center would include monuments with comparable symbolism, such as pillars dedicated to four gods.

== See also ==
- Greek mythology
- Roman mythology

== Bibliography ==
- Adam, Jean-Pierre; Jambon, Fabienne (1972). "Le pilier d'Yzeures-sur-Creuse". Société archéologique de Touraine (in French). XXXVII: 99–106. ISSN 1153-2521. Archived from the original on June 12, 2024.
- Bosseboeuf, Louis-Auguste (1896a). "Le temple gallo-romain de Minerve à Yzeures". Société archéologique de Touraine (in French). X: 335–353. ISSN 1153-2521. Archived from the original on June 12, 2024.
- de La Croix, Camille (1896). Mémoire adressé à deux sections du ministère de l'Instruction publique et des Beaux-Arts: Comité des travaux historiques (section d'archéologie) et commission des monuments historiques (8 mai 1896) (in French). Poitiers: Blais.
- Espérandieu, Émile (1912). "La colonne d'Yzeures". Revue Archéologique (in French) (XX): 211–215. Archived from the original on June 12, 2024.
- Hervé, Christèle (1999). "Yzeures-sur-Creuse". Revue archéologique du Centre de la France, FERACF (in French). 1 (17): 155–158. Archived from the original on June 12, 2024.
- Provost, Michel (1988). L'Indre-et Loire. Carte archéologique de la Gaule (in French). Vol. 37. Paris: Académie des Inscriptions et Belles-Lettres. ISBN 2-8775-4002-2.
- de Rochebrune, Octave (1897). Le temple gallo-romain d'Yzeures (in French). Vannes: Lafolye.
- Tendron, Graziella (2010). Le pilier d'Yzeures-sur-Creuse (Indre-et-Loire). Memoria Momenti (in French). Vol. 26. Chauvigny: Association des publications chauvinoises. ISSN 1294-5870.
- Tendron, Graziella (2014). Yzeures-sur-Creuse (37). Les monuments romains: témoins de l'architecture religieuse d'une agglomération secondaire. Memoria Momenti (in French). Vol. 32. Chauvigny: Association des publications chauvinoises.
