= Yzeures-sur-Creuse =

- Commune
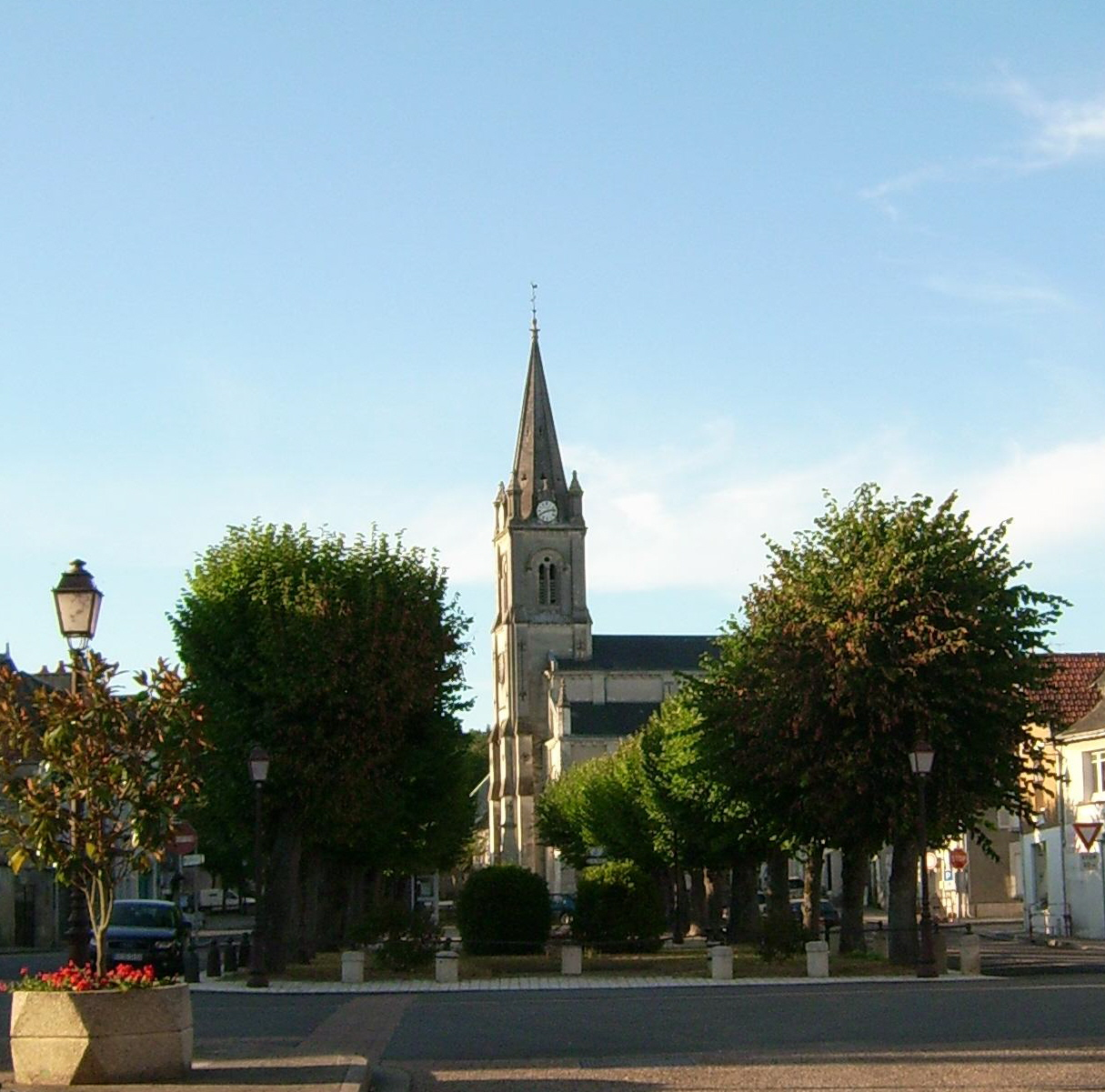
- Main square and church
- Location of Yzeures-sur-Creuse
- Location within France Location within Centre-Val de Loire
- Coordinates: 46°47′11″N 0°52′18″E
- Country: France
- Region: Centre-Val de Loire
- Department: Indre-et-Loire
- Arrondissement: Loches
- Canton: Descartes
- Intercommunality: Loches Sud Touraine

Government
  - Mayor (2020–2026): Jacky Périvier
- Area^{1}: 55.42 km^{2} (21.40 sq mi)
- Highest elevation: 139 m (456 ft)
- Lowest elevation: 53 m (174 ft)
- Population (2023): 1,348
  - Density: 24.32/km^{2} (63.00/sq mi)
- Demonym(s): Yzeurois, Yzeuroise
- Time zone: UTC+01:00 (CET)
  - Summer (DST): UTC+02:00 (CEST)
- INSEE/Postal code: 37282 /37290
- ^{1} French Land Register data, which excludes lakes, ponds, glaciers > 1 km^{2} (0.386 sq mi or 247 acres) and river estuaries.

Yzeures-sur-Creuse (French pronunciation: [izœʁ syʁ kʁøz], literally Yzeures on Creuse) is a commune in the department of Indre-et-Loire, Centre-Val de Loire, France.

It is one of the oldest towns in Touraine, occupation dating back to the Upper Paleolithic era earlier than 10,0 CE. Today, it is a village of 1300 inhabitants, situated in a rural setting. The town benefits from the spa activity of the nearby town of La Roche-Posay. Yzeures also offers a range of tourism activities and second homes are numerous.

Its inhabitants are called Yzeurois, Yzeuroises.

== Geography ==
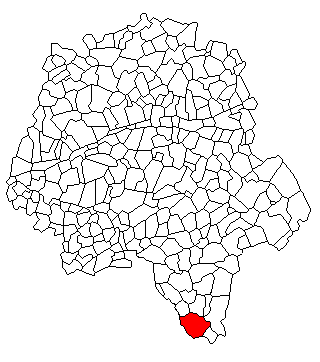
Yzeures sur Creuse in the Indre et Loire département.

Yzeures-sur-Creuse is located between Tours and Poitiers in the centre of France, on the banks of the river Creuse. The Creuse meets its tributary Gartempe 3 kilometres (1.9 mi) from Yzeures near the spa town of La Roche-Posay.

It has the distinction of being the only town of Touraine to expand both on the right bank and left bank of the Creuse. It is also the only town in the department to be watered by the Gartempe.

Yzeures sur Creuse lies at the meeting point of the three departments of Indre-et-Loire (37), Indre (36) and Vienne (86).

=== Neighboring communes ===
The town has nine surrounding communities. Five are located in the department of Indre-et-Loire (Chambon, Boussay, Preuilly-sur-Claise, Bossay-sur-Claise and Tournon-Saint-Pierre), three in the department of Vienne (Vicq-sur-Gartempe, La Roche-Posay and Lésigny) and one in the department of Indre (Neons-sur-Creuse).

=== Nearby towns ===
By road, the village is located midway between Descartes, Châtellerault and Le Blanc about 15.5 miles (24.9 km). Tours is 85 km distant, and Poitiers 53 km distant.

== Population ==
Historical population

Year	Pop.	±% p.a.
1793	1,298	—
1800	1,286	−0.13%
1806	1,347	+0.78%
1821	1,389	+0.20%
1831	1,690	+1.98%
1836	1,774	+0.97%
1841	1,828	+0.60%
1846	1,880	+0.56%
1851	1,874	−0.06%
1856	1,938	+0.67%
1861	1,908	−0.31%
1866	1,903	−0.05%
1872	1,855	−0.42%
1876	1,837	−0.24%
1881	1,792	−0.49%
1886	1,823	+0.34%
1891	1,874	+0.55%
1896	1,843	−0.33%
1901	1,793	−0.55%

Year	Pop.	±% p.a.
1906	1,777	−0.18%
1911	1,728	−0.56%
1921	1,625	−0.61%
1926	1,653	+0.34%
1931	1,607	−0.56%
1936	1,520	−1.11%
1946	1,527	+0.05%
1954	1,445	−0.69%
1962	1,529	+0.71%
1968	1,588	+0.63%
1975	1,737	+1.29%
1982	1,820	+0.67%
1990	1,747	−0.51%
1999	1,476	−1.86%
2007	1,463	−0.11%
2012	1,436	−0.37%
2017	1,380	−0.79%
2023	1,348	−0.39%

Source: EHESS (1793-1999) and INSEE

== Sights ==
=== Archaeological structures ===
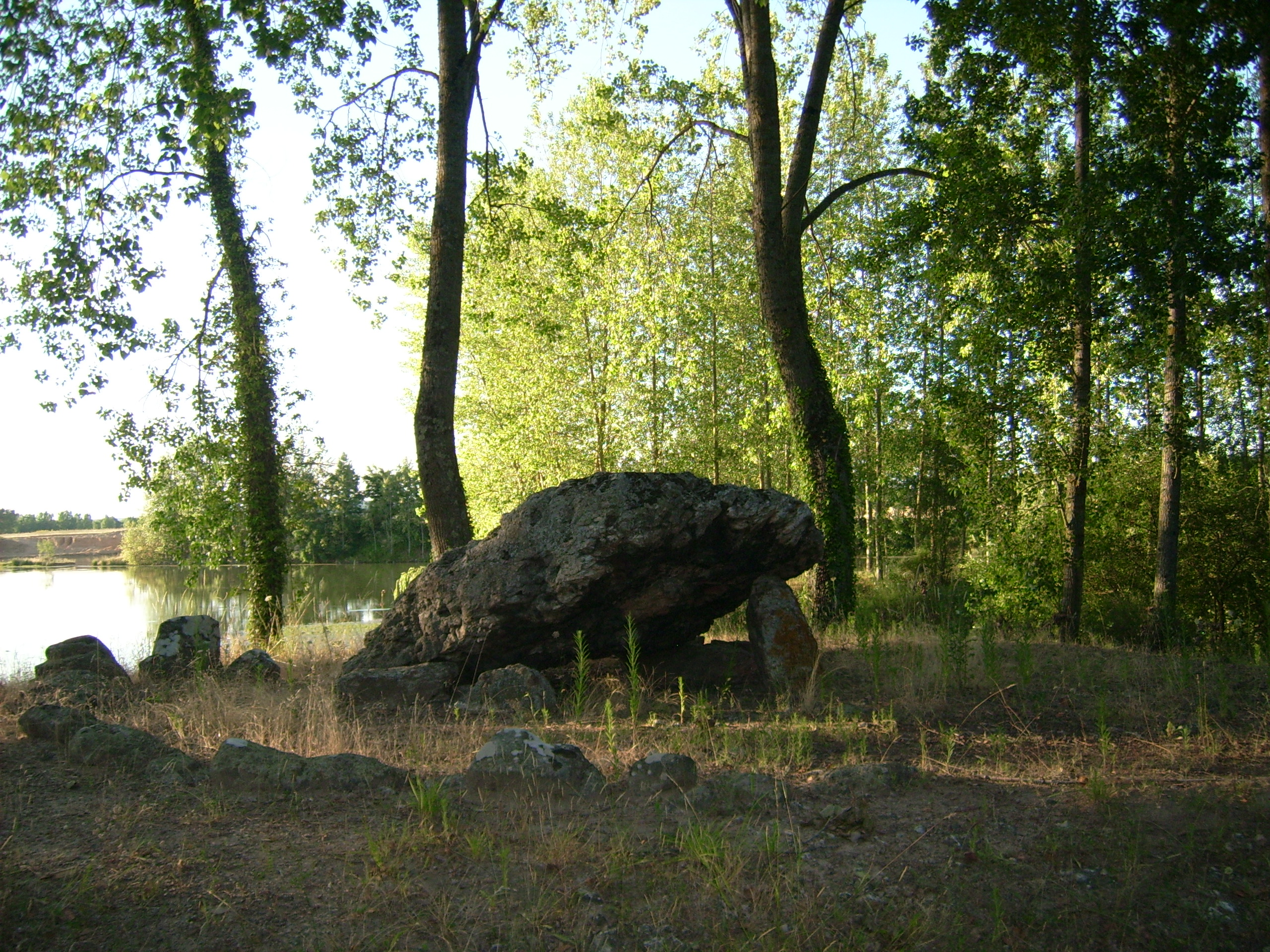
Dolmen de la Pierre Levée

- Dolmen de la Pierre Levée, near the hamlet of Confluent.

=== Buildings ===
- The manor house of Granges, dating from the sixteenth century. Has been listed as a monument historique
- The château of Harembure, dating from the eighteenth century to the nineteenth century
- The château of Pairé or Péré, dating from the sixteenth century
- The château of Thou, dating from the sixteenth century. Has been listed as a monument historique
- The château of Marigny, dating from the seventeenth century.
- The manor house of Gaudru, dating from the fifteenth century.
- The château of La Mothe, dating from the nineteenth century.
- The church of Notre-Dame, rebuilt in the nineteenth century. This church is built on the site of a Gallo-Roman temple of Minerva.

=== Museums ===
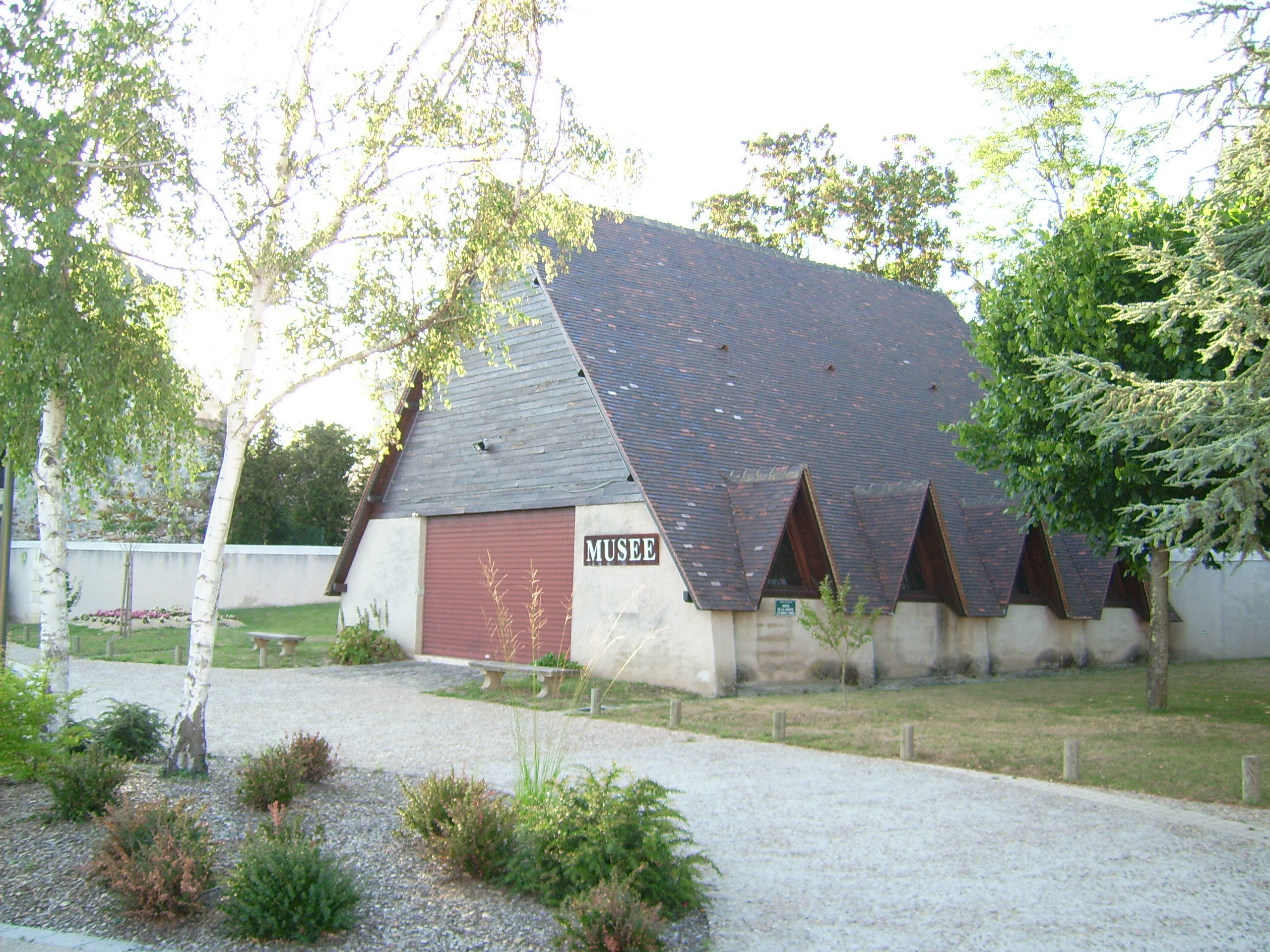
Gallo-Roman Museum of Minerva

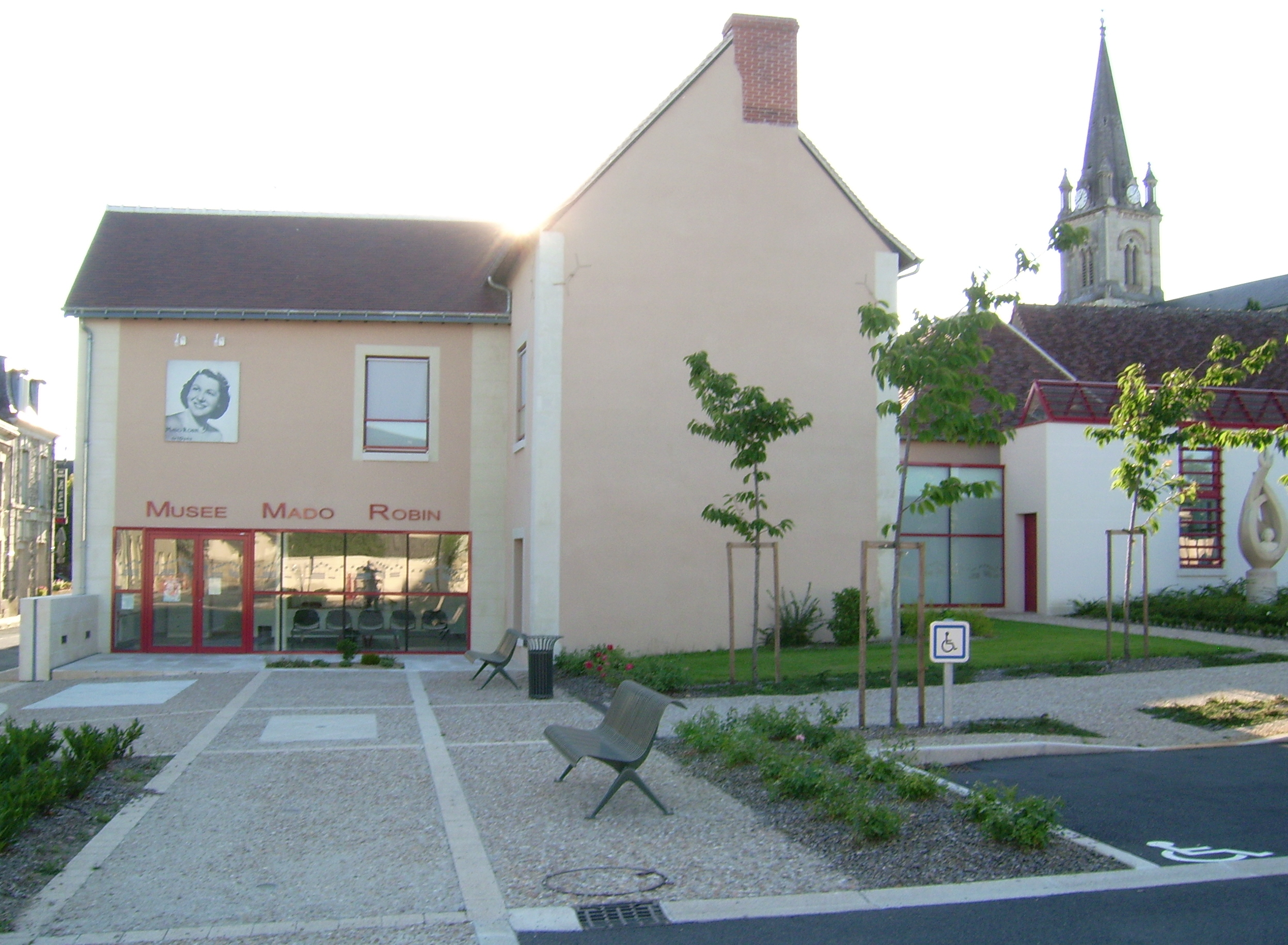
Mado Robin Museum

- Mado Robin Museum : Museum to the life of this French soprano. (opened in 2009)

You can see pictures, posters and audio-visual materials, and also her stage costumes presented in reconstituted sets of her greatest roles.

- Gallo Roman Museum of Minerva : 80 sculptures limestone blocks and fragmentary sculptures of a Gallo-Roman temple and a column of Minerva. It regularly hosts temporary exhibitions.

== Events ==
- Yzeures'n'Flore. Festival of flowers in April.
- Fête de la Musique

== Personalities ==
This is a list of people of interest who were born or resided in Yzeures:

- Yzeures is the birthplace of Mado Robin (1918–1960) a French coloratura soprano who could hit the octave range of D4 above high-C (D7 in scientific pitch notation or about 2349 Hz).
- Agnès Sorel was a mistress of King Charles VII of France. As the story goes, she was born to Fromenteau, a Yzeures's hamlet.
- Paul Burty Haviland (17 June 1880 – 21 December 1950) was an early French-American 20th-century photographer. Havilland died at his estate in Yzeures-sur-Creuse, in 1950.

== See also ==
- Horned Serpent
- Communes of the Indre-et-Loire department
- French Wikipedia fr:Yzeures-sur-Creuse
- Pillar of Yzeures-sur-Creuse
