= Mado Robin =

French coloratura soprano

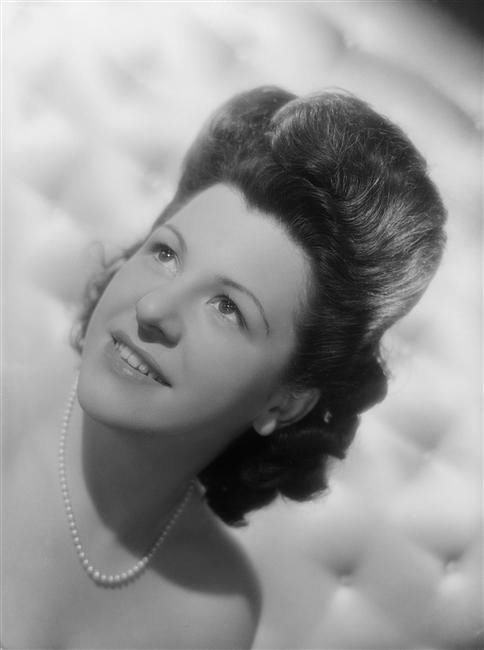
- Robin in 1944
- Born: Madeleine Marie Robin; 29 December 1918; Yzeures-sur-Creuse, Touraine, France
- Died: 10 December 1960 (aged 41); Paris, France
- Occupation: Operatic soprano

Madeleine Marie "Mado" Robin (French pronunciation: [madlɛn maʁi mado ʁɔbɛ̃]; 29 December 1918 – 10 December 1960) was a French coloratura soprano. A soprano acuto sfogato, she was noted for her extremely high register.

== Early life ==
Robin was born in Yzeures-sur-Creuse, where she owned the Château des Vallées. Mado took her first singing lessons when she was only 13 years old but not with the intention to make a career out of it. Mario Podesta studied with Mado and he, who had been a student of Fernando De Lucia, noticed the extraordinary high register of her voice.

== Career ==
A star of television and radio in the 1950s, she was well known in France. Among her roles were Lakmé, which she recorded for Decca Records in 1952 (with Georges Sébastian conducting), Lucia di Lammermoor, Olympia in The Tales of Hoffmann, Gilda in Rigoletto, Rosina in The Barber of Seville, and Leïla in Les pêcheurs de perles. In 1954, she went to San Francisco to sing Lucia and Gilda, and had a successful tour of the Soviet Union with sixteen concerts over a few weeks.

== Death and honors ==
Robin died in Paris in 1960 from cancer (some sources state liver cancer, others leukaemia) a few days before the 1500th performance of Lakmé at the Opéra-Comique, which had organized the event for her birthday.

A museum to her life, the Musée Mado Robin, opened in her home town in 2009.

== Videography ==
In 1994, the Bel Canto Society released a video-cassette of her performances, entitled Mado Robin Live!; included are excerpts from Lakmé, Mireille, Rigoletto, Hamlet, Il barbiere di Siviglia and Lucia di Lammermoor.
