= Shelly limestone =

Limestone containing many fossils

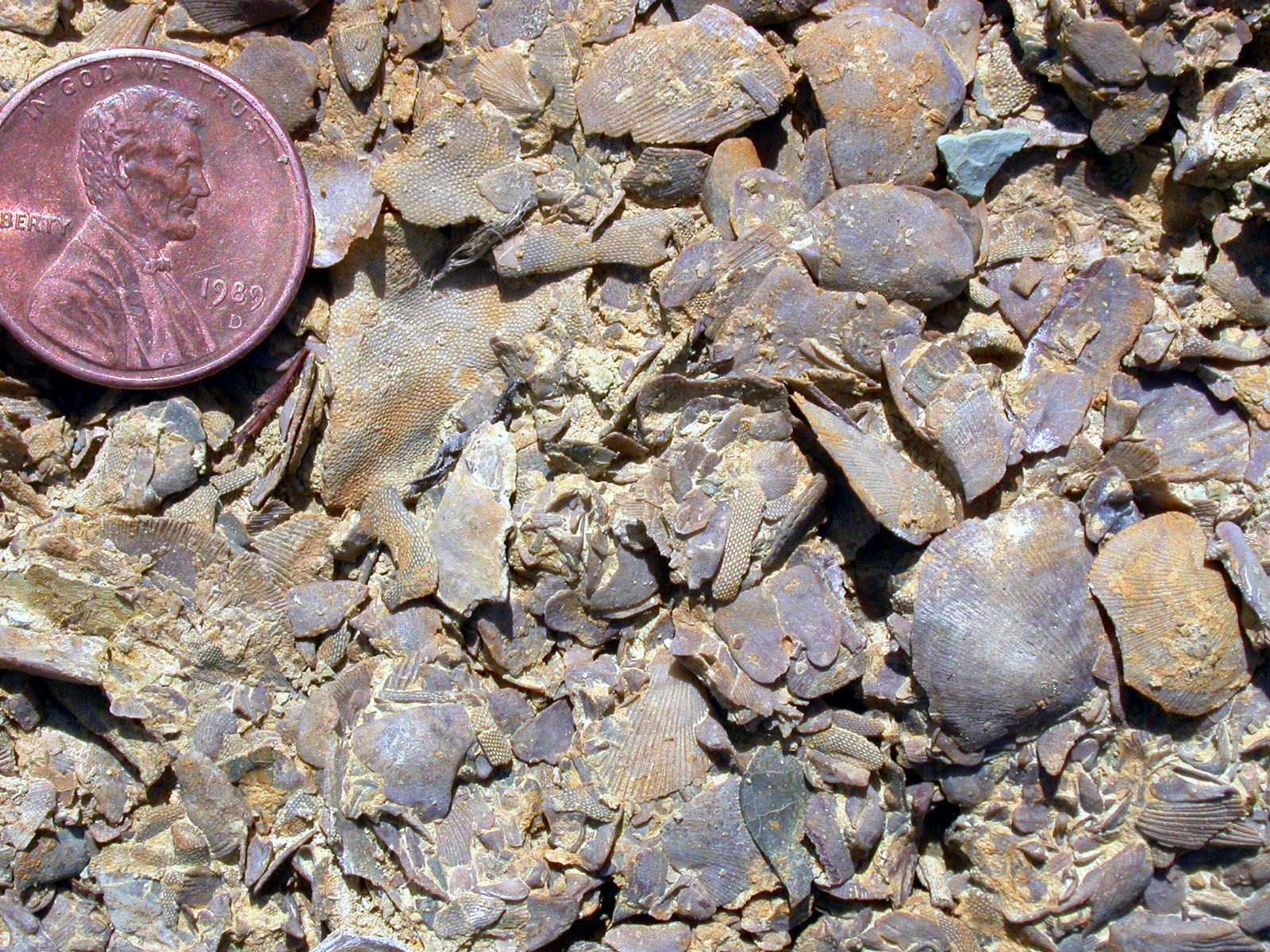
Brachiopods and bryozoans in an Ordovician shelly limestone, southern Minnesota

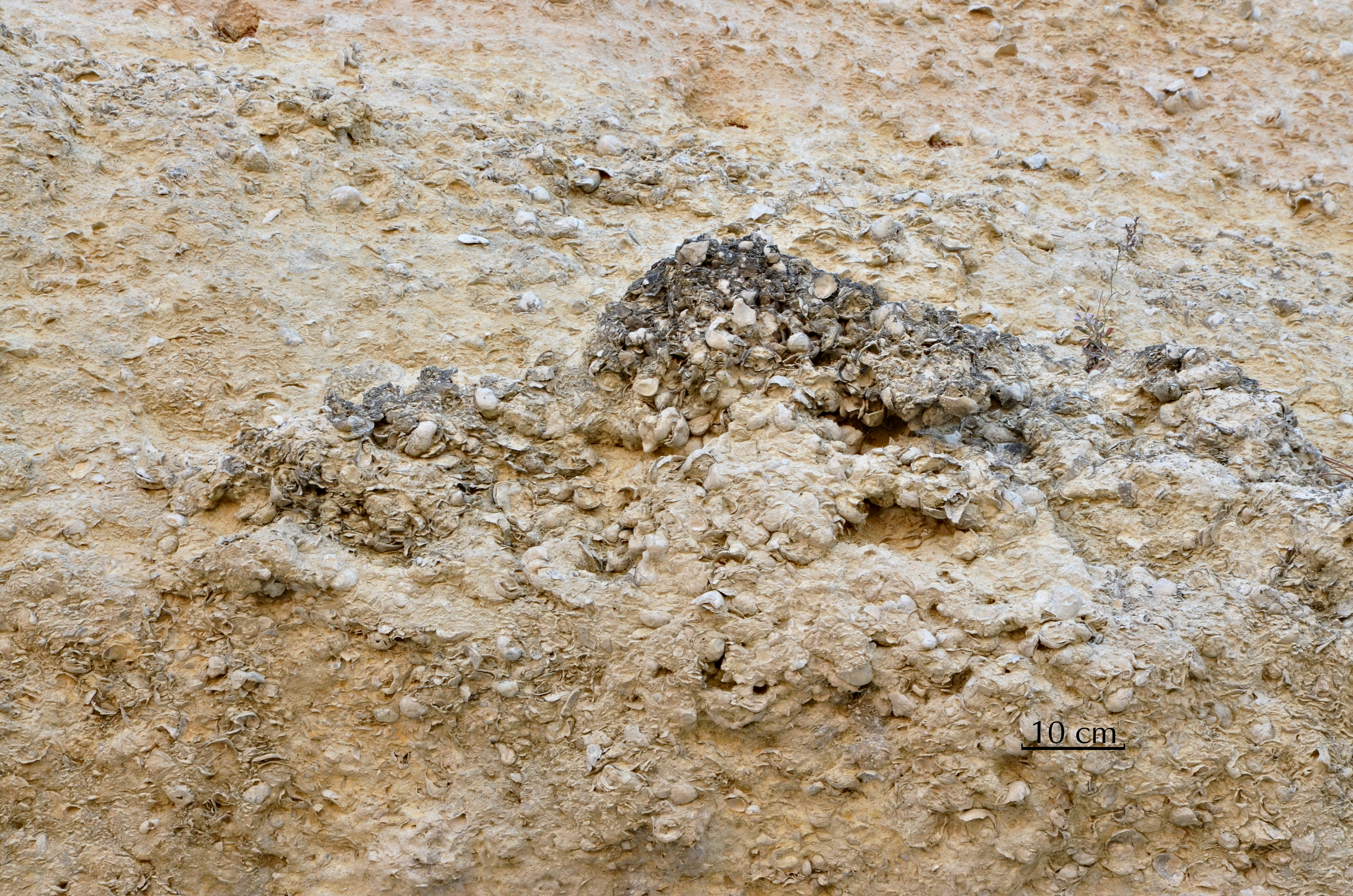
Shelly limestone from Suzac, France

Shelly limestone is a highly fossiliferous limestone composed of numerous fossilised organisms such as brachiopods, bryozoans, crinoids, sponges, corals and molluscs. It varies in colour, texture and hardness. Coquina is a poorly indurated form of shelly limestone.

Shelly limestone is a sedimentary rock because it is made up of fragments. It consists of broken shells that are "glued" together by calcite. Calcium carbonate often makes up a significant proportion of the rock, while shell fragments can range in size from fine grains to large pebbles. Its colour is typically grey.

== Formation ==
Each shelly limestone is unique, as every specimen is composed of different fossilised organisms and shell fragments. Shelly limestones are mainly found in areas where marine life currently lives or once lived.

The characteristics of shelly limestone are largely determined by calcite, which acts as a cementing agent binding shell fragments, dead marine organisms and other minerals. Typically, the rock is composed primarily of carbonate minerals, especially calcium carbonate. Its appearance can vary in colour, composition, hardness and texture depending on the environment in which it formed, although visible shell fragments of varying sizes are usually present.

Shelly limestone forms when rocks are weathered into fragments and transported to a body of water. There, organisms that produce carbonate, phosphate and silicate materials contribute to the sediment. These materials accumulate through deposition, where particles are sorted by size and density. Over time, the sediments undergo diagenesis, during which they are compacted and cemented together to form solid rock.

Shelly limestone deposits are known from as early as the Precambrian and Cambrian periods.

== Applications ==
Shelly limestone is found worldwide and is used to help identify the geological period in which it formed, the types of organisms present at that time, and the environmental conditions based on its mineral composition. Fossil shells within the rock can also contain geochemical information useful for reconstructing past climates.

Like other forms of limestone, it is used in the production of cement for construction. Due to its high calcium carbonate content, it is also used in agriculture to reduce soil acidity.

== Bibliography ==
- Matthews, S. C., and Missarzhevsky, V. V. (1975). "Small Shelly Fossils of Late Precambrian and Early Cambrian Age: A Review of Recent Work." Journal of the Geological Society 131 (3): 289–303. https://doi.org/10.1144/gsjgs.131.3.0289
- Brasier, M. D. (1984). "Microfossils and Small Shelly Fossils from the Lower Cambrian Hyolithes Limestone at Nuneaton, English Midlands." Geological Magazine 121 (3): 229–253. https://doi.org/10.1017/S0016756800028296
- Jago, J. B., Zang, W.-L., Sun, X., Brock, G. A., Paterson, J. R., and Skovsted, C. B. (2006). "A Review of the Cambrian Biostratigraphy of South Australia." Palaeoworld 15 (3–4): 406–423. https://doi.org/10.1016/j.palwor.2006.10.014
- Evans, K. R., and Rowell, A. J. (1990). "Small Shelly Fossils from Antarctica: An Early Cambrian Faunal Connection with Australia." Journal of Paleontology 64 (5): 692–700. https://doi.org/10.1017/S0022336000018928

== See also ==
- List of types of limestone
- Limestone – sedimentary rock composed largely of marine organism fragments
- Precambrian
- Sedimentary rock
- Pillar of Yzeures-sur-Creuse
