= École d'Architecture Marne-la-Vallée =

State-financed architecture school in Paris, France

Coordinates: 48°50′28″N 2°30′25″E

École d’architecture de la ville & des territoires Paris-Est
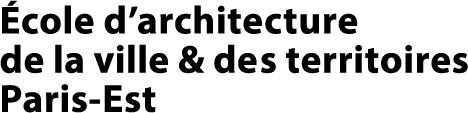
- Other names: ÉAVT, ENSA Paris-Est, ENSA Marne-la-Vallée
- Type: Public
- Established: 1998; 28 years ago by Yves Lion
- Affiliations: RENATER
- Budget: 11.6 million EUR (2019)
- President: Amina Sellali
- Academic staff: 97 (2019-2020)
- Administrative staff: 34 (2019-2020)
- Students: 734 (2019-2020)
- Undergraduates: 325 (2019-2020)
- Postgraduates: 409 (2019-2020)
- Location: Champs-sur-Marne, Île-de-France, France
- Campus: Urban
- Language: French, English
- Website: paris-est.archi.fr

Location: Champs-sur-Marne, Île-de-France, France

The École d'architecture de la ville et des territoires Paris-Est (formerly École d’architecture de la ville et des territoires à Marne-la-Vallée), Éav&t for short, is a fully accredited state-financed architecture school located in the east of Paris, France.

The school offers 5 programs in architecture:

- Diplôme d'études en architecture conférant le grade de license
- Diplôme d'État en architecture conférant le grade de master
- HMONP - Habilitation à la Maîtrise d'œuvre en son Nom Propre
- DSA - Diplôme de spécialisation et d'approfondissement en architecture
- DPEA - Diplôme propre aux Écoles d'architecture, architecture post-carbone

== History ==
The school was created in 1998 and designed by renowned architect Bernard Tschumi.

== Campus ==
As of January 1, 2020, the Éav&t is a part of the Gustave Eiffel University. The university is located in the Cité Descartes campus in Champs-sur-Marne (Seine-et-Marne), and englobes the ESIEE Paris school of engineering, the École des ingénieurs de la Ville de Paris, the École nationale des sciences géographiques and École d'Architecture Marne-la-Vallée.

The building epitomizes all that has to be taken into consideration for architecture students and is made of several materials and theories: steel, concrete, glass. Cantilevers, open space and the "box within a box".

== Student body ==
The school accommodates about 700 students. Most of the students are in first year (about 90 to 120 depending on the years), this figure slowly evolves to about 30- 50 students in the final fifth year.

First-year admissions are to be made through Parcoursup and are considered highly selective with an acceptance rate as low as 15% in 2021.

== Goals ==
The school's goals strongly focuses, as its name suggests, on the city and its context, its territory and environment. Many town-planning classes and theories overlap with the main studio. Studio work is one of the most important features of the school.

The school, although very new, is rivaling with other architecture schools that have had a high visibility in quality, knowing that since the May 1968 student riots in France, La Villette and Belleville architecture schools symbolised a very strong separation with the Beaux Arts school, and has since maintained a distinct reputation since.

The École d’architecture de la ville et des territoires (ÉAVT) is slowly changing this.

It has some of the most influent and important architects that practice in France and abroad as its teachers.

The school was ranked 5th best architecture school of France by diplomeo.com and Archiprep.com in 2020 and 2022 respectively.

== Faculty ==
Some professors had the chance to have been influenced by Henri Ciriani, who was a disciple of Le Corbusier.

- Yves Lion, architect, is one of the founders of the school.
- Jacques Lucan, architect & renowned French theorist is also a teacher at the École Polytechnique Fédérale de Lausanne, Switzerland.
- Marc Mimram, engineer and architect who studied at École des ponts ParisTech and the University of California, Berkeley.
- David Mangin, architect and town planner, has widely published books on the matter. He is currently working on the Les Halles renovation in the center of Paris.
- Jean-Jacques Treutel, architect and town planner, is working on the extension of La Défense Financial District in the west of Paris.
- Jean-François Blassel, engineer, is also teacher at the University of Pennsylvania.
- Jean-Pierre Adam, architect and archaeologist.

== Exchange programs and partner universities ==
Éav&t has partnerships throughout the world with notable architecture schools and institutes. The school is also part of the Erasmus+ program which offers opportunities for student to study abroad in Europe.

=== Erasmus+ partnerships ===
==== Germany ====
- Cologne University of Applied Sciences, Cologne
- University of Hanover, Hanover
- Karlsruhe Institute of Technology, Karlsruhe
- Technical University of Munich, Munich

==== Belgium ====
- Université libre de Bruxelles, Brussels
- Ghent University, Ghent

==== Spain ====
- Polytechnic University of Catalonia, Catalonia
- Francisco de Vitoria University, Madrid

==== Greece ====
- University of Thessaly, Thessaly

==== Ireland ====
- Waterford Institute of Technology, Waterford

==== Italy ====
- University of Bologna, Bologna
- University of Genoa, Genoa
- Sapienza University of Rome, Rome
- Roma Tre University, Rome
- Università Iuav di Venezia, Venice

==== Portugal ====
- University of Minho, Braga

=== International partnerships ===
==== Argentina ====
- University of Buenos Aires, Buenos Aires

==== Brazil ====
- University of São Paulo, São Paulo
- Mackenzie Presbyterian University, São Paulo

==== Canada ====
- Université du Québec à Montréal, Montreal

==== Chile ====
- Diego Portales University, Santiago

==== Israel ====
- Bezalel Academy of Arts and Design, Jerusalem

==== Lebanon ====
- Lebanese Academy of Fine Arts, Beirut

==== Switzerland ====
- École Polytechnique Fédérale de Lausanne, Lausanne
