= Roman Building =

1989 book by Jean-Pierre Adam

Roman Building: Materials and Techniques
- Author: Jean-Pierre Adam
- Original title: La Construction Romaine: matériaux et techniques
- Translator: Anthony Mathews
- Language: French
- Subject: Ancient Roman architecture, ancient Roman engineering
- Genre: Nonfiction
- Publication date: 1984
- Publication place: France
- English publication date: 1994
- Pages: 360 (English translation)
- ISBN: 0-7134-7167-0

Roman Building: Materials and Techniques (French: La Construction Romaine: matériaux et techniques) is a treatise on Roman construction by French architect and archaeologist Jean-Pierre Adam, first published in 1984. A second edition was published in 1989, and an English translation by Anthony Mathews was published in 1994. The book comprehensively studies architecture across the Roman empire throughout its history, focusing on technique rather than design.

== Contents ==
The book has 11 chapters:

- Surveying
- Materials
- Construction using Large Stone Blocks
- Structures of Mixed Construction
- Masonry Construction
- Arches and Vaults
- Carpentry
- Wall Covering
- Floors
- Civil Engineering
- Domestic and Commercial Architecture

== Reception ==
When the translation was released, several reviewers of Roman Building such as classicist Nigel Spivey commended it for its thorough, accurate coverage. These English-speaking academics noted its ambitious scope beyond almost all previous scholarly works: it treated all areas of construction technique throughout ancient Rome's history across all of Roman territory. While classicist Roger Ulrich was among them, he noticed that the French author emphasized Italy, Gaul and North Africa in his choice of examples, and within Italy the well-preserved cities of Pompeii and Herculaneum. He also faulted the treatise's sometimes inaccurate handling of Latin technical terminology.

== Bibliography ==
- Adam, Jean-Pierre (1994). Roman Building: Materials and Techniques. Translated by Mathews, Anthony. London: B.T. Batsford. ISBN 0-7134-7167-0.
- Spivey, Nigel (October 1995). "Subject Reviews: Archaeology and Art". Greece & Rome. 47 (1): 242–244. doi:10.1017/S0017383500025717. JSTOR 643234.
- Ulrich, Roger B. (1995). "Review: Roman Building: Materials and Techniques". Journal of Field Archaeology. 22 (4): 499–501. doi:10.2307/530199. JSTOR 530199.
- Walcot, P. (April 2000). "Subject Reviews: Reprints". Greece & Rome. 47 (1): 129–131. doi:10.1093/gr/47.1.129. JSTOR 826952.
- Yeomans, David (June 1999). "Review: Roman Building: Materials and Techniques by Jean-Pierre Adam, Anthony Mathews; Technics and Architecture. The Development of Materials and Systems for Buildings by Cecil D. Elliott; Historical Building Construction, Design, Materials, and Technology by Donald Friedman; The Stone Skeleton. Structural Engineering of Masonry Architecture by Jacques Heyman; Rise of the New York Skyscraper, 1865-1913 by Sarah Bradford Landau, Carl W. Condit; Architectural Technology up to the Scientific Revolution: The Art and Structure of Large-Scale Buildings by Robert Mark; Building the Nineteenth Century by Tom F. Peters". Journal of the Society of Architectural Historians. 58 (2): 233–237. doi:10.2307/991501. JSTOR 991501.
