= Jacques Lucan =

French academic, architect, and historian (1947–2023)

- Born: 21 December 1947
- Died: 8 October 2023 (aged 75)
- Education: Architecture Diploma of the French Government
- Occupations: Professor; Architect; Historian

Jacques Lucan (21 December 1947 – 8 October 2023) was a French academic, architect, and historian.

== Biography ==
Born on 21 December 1947, Lucan earned an Architecture Diploma of the French Government in Paris in 1972. He served as editor-in-chief of the magazine Architecture Mouvement Continuité from 1978 to 1988. He joined the École Nationale Supérieure d'Architecture de Paris-Belleville in 1981 and taught theories on architectural composition and urban theories and doctrines in transformation of cities. He created publications on his research on criticisms, theories, and history of architecture and was the author of several books.

In 1993, Lucan began his participation in town planning competitions, creating four housing buildings and a library in Paris and urban developments in Île d'Yeu. In October 1997, he became a professor of architectural theory at the École Polytechnique Fédérale de Lausanne (EPFL). From 2006 to 2008, he directed the "Architecture, ville, histoire" doctoral program at the EPFL's Faculty of Natural Environment. In 1998, he co-founded the École d’architecture de la ville & des territoires à Marne-la-Vallée, which became the École d'Architecture Marne-la-Vallée, and taught there until 2020.

Jacques Lucan died on 8 October 2023, at the age of 75.

== Works ==
- Le Corbusier, une encyclopédie (1987)
- France Architecture 1965-1988 (1989)
- OMA - Rem Koolhaas. Pour une culture de la congestion (1990)
- Eau et gaz à tous les étages - Paris, cent ans de logement (1992)
- Paris des faubourgs - Formation-transformation (1996)
- Matière d'art - A Matter of Art. Architecture contemporaine en Suisse (2001)
- Architecture en France (1940-2000). Histoire et théories (2001)
- Fernand Pouillon architecte - Pantin, Montrouge, Boulogne-Billancourt, Meudon-la-Forêt (2003)
- Forme forte. Écrits/Schriften 1972-2002 (2003)
- "Des lignes de fuite, entretien avec Jacques Lucan" (2008)
- "Langage de la critique, critique du langage. La transition postmoderne" (2009)
- "Les faubourgs ou l’ambiguïté urbaine" (2009)
- Composition, non-composition. Architecture et théories, XIXe-XXe siècles (2009)
- Où va la ville aujourd'hui ? Formes urbaines et mixités (2012)
- Précisions sur un état présent de l'architecture (2015)
- Habiter: Villes et Architecture (2021)
