= Octave de Rochebrune =

French painter

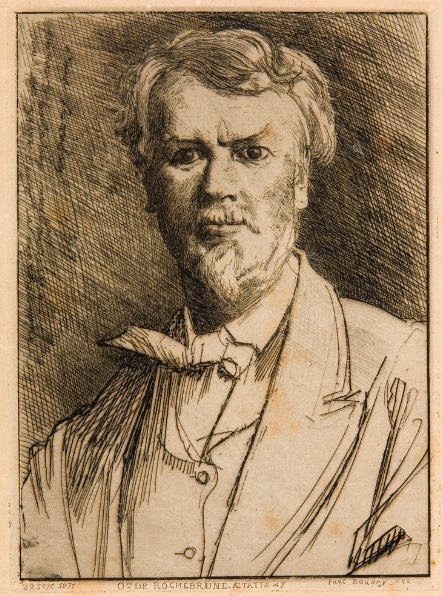
- Born: 1 April 1824; Fontenay-le-Comte, Vendée, France
- Died: 1 July 1900 (aged 76); Fontenay-le-Comte, Vendée, France
- Occupations: Painter, sculptor, etcher

Octave de Rochebrune (1824–1900) was a French painter, sculptor and etcher. He did 492 etchings, including etchings of the Château de Blois, the Château de Chambord and the Château de Vitré.
