= Jean-Pierre Adam =

French archaeologist (born 1937)

Jean-Pierre Adam (born 24 November 1937 in Paris) is a French architect and archaeologist specialising in ancient architecture.

== Biography ==
Adam was born in Paris. Following a special diploma from the School of Architecture in 1965, he entered the ancient architecture department of the CNRS. He produced several monumental studies in France and worldwide, and became director of the Office of Ancient Architecture of Paris, located in the north tower of the Castle of Vincennes.

He has conducted various studies on architectural excavation sites of various Ancient Roman, Greek and Egyptian sites around the Mediterranean, including in Pompeii and in 1999 he published a book about Roman architecture entitled Roman Building: Materials and Techniques. Previously, he had also excavated the Tomb of Akhethetep in Saqqarah along with Christiane Ziegler and Guillemette Andreu-Lanoë between 1991 and 1999, publishing their findings in a book. He has authored books on Greek architecture L'architecture militaire grecque (2000) as well as on Ancient Egypt, Les pyramides d'Égypte. He has conducted research at the Institute de Recherche d' Architecture Antique.

As of 2021, he was teaching at the École du Louvre, the École de Chaillot, the École d’architecture de la ville et des territoires Paris-Est and the École Polytechnique Fédérale de Lausanne (EPFL); he had also held positions in Paris, Rome and the Lebanon.

== Publications ==
- Le passé recomposé. Chroniques d'archéologie fantasque (1988)
- L'archéologie devant l'imposture (1975)
