= Saint Agnes of Poitiers =

6th-century French saint and abbess

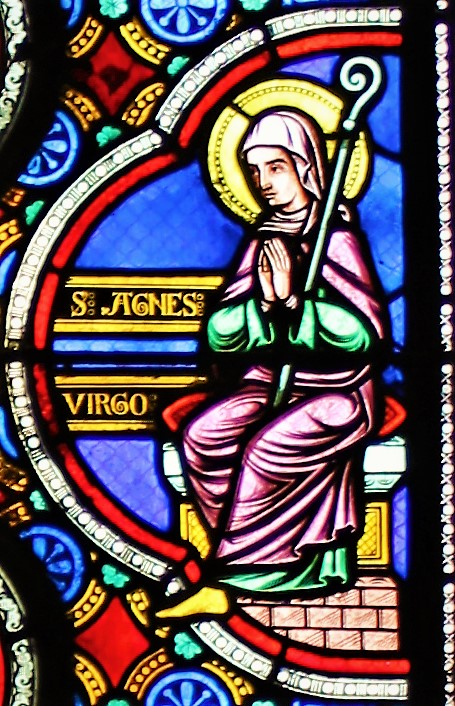
- Born: unknown
- Died: c. 586; France
- Venerated in: Roman Catholic Church
- Canonized: Pre-congregation
- Feast: 13 May

St. Agnes of Poitiers is a French saint and abbess, who was "recognized for her holiness and intelligence" and called "model of the conventual life". She served as abbess of Holy Cross convent in Poitiers, France until her death in 586.

Agnes was raised in court and was the adopted and "spiritual" daughter of St. Radegund, a Thuringian princess and Frankish queen who founded Holy Cross, a double monastery that housed 200 nuns and was known as a place of learning, in 557. Agnes and Radegund visited Arles to study the Rule of St. Caesarius in circa 570; the rule was eventually adopted at Poitiers. Scholar Brian Brennan stated that Agnes and Radegund were "virtually forced" to accept St. Caesarius' rule because they did not have the support of the local bishop.

Agnes is remembered for her connection and friendship with the poet and hymn writer St. Venantius Fortunatus, who visited Holy Cross and settled nearby for the remainder of his life. She and Radegund became his patrons; they sent him gifts and "mountains of food", and he wrote them "highly-stylized verse letters," including greetings to Agnes on the anniversary of her installation as abbess. According to Brennan, "the tone of these personal poems ls light-hearted and jocular suggesting a close and familiar relationship between the poet and his patronesses". The intimacy displayed in Venantius' correspondences to Agnes were construed as "close to being love poems"; the intimacy displayed in them resulted in a "malicious rumor among Venantius' contemporaries". He had to write Agnes assuring her that he only thought of her in a "fraternal or spiritual way", and the nuns excluded him from the monastery for a time.

Agnes' relics are preserved in the Church of Saint Radegund; her tomb is a popular pilgrimage in the area. Her feast day is 13 May.

== Works cited ==
- Brennan, Brian, 1985. "St. Radegund and the early development of her cult at Poitiers". Journal of Religious History, 13(4), pp. 340-354.
