= Hôtel de Ville, Poitiers =

Town hall in Poitiers, France

Hôtel de Ville
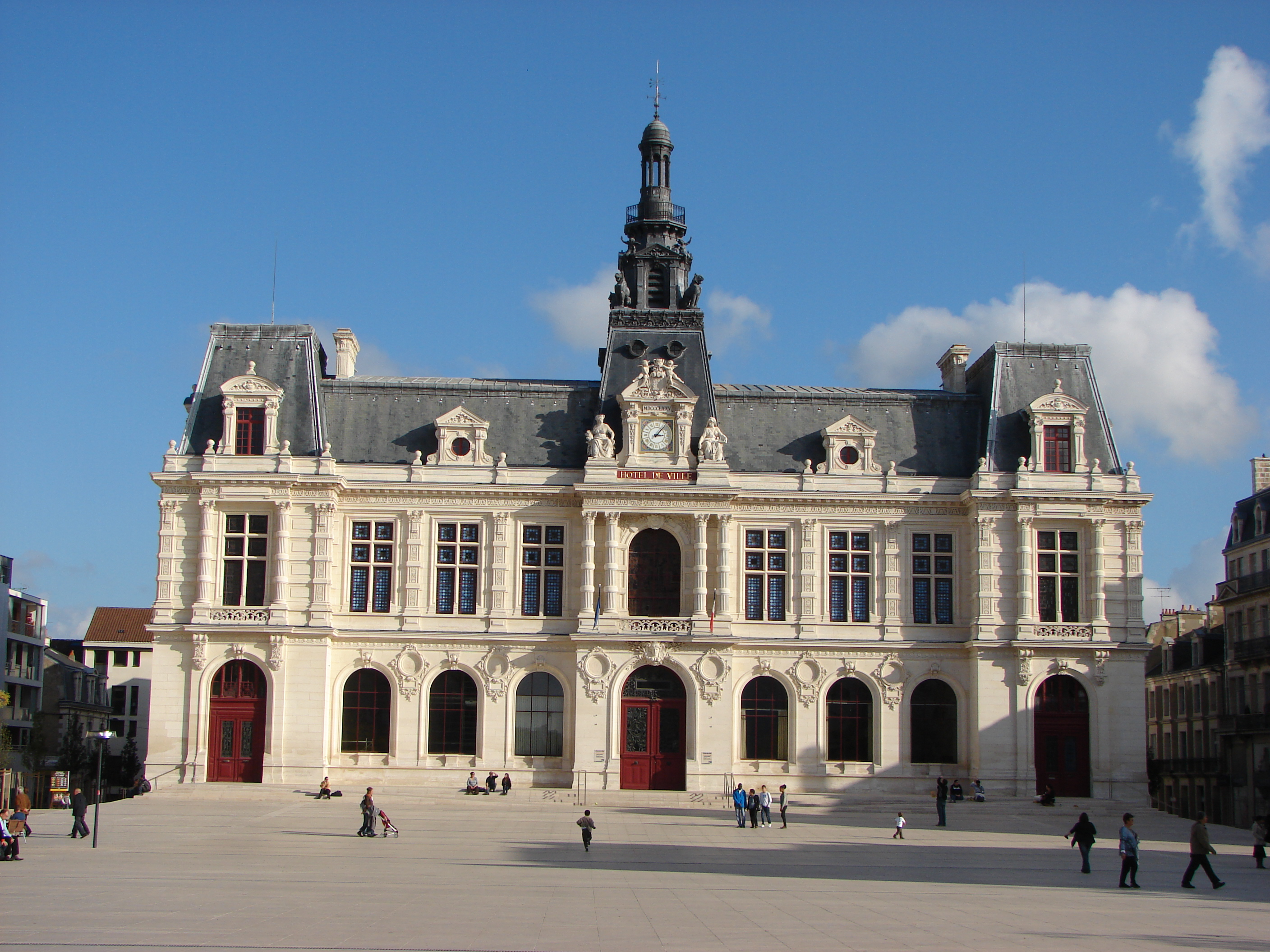
- The main frontage of the Hôtel de Ville in November 2011

General information
- Type: City hall
- Architectural style: Second Empire style
- Location: Poitiers, France
- Coordinates: 46.5801°N 0.3410°E
- Completed: 1875

Design and construction
- Architect: Antoine-Gaetan Guérinot

Monument historique
- Official name: Hôtel de ville
- Type: Inscrit
- Designated: 1975
- Reference no.: PA00105619

The Hôtel de Ville (French pronunciation: [otɛl də vil], City Hall) is a municipal building in Poitiers, Vienne, western France, standing on Place du Maréchal-Leclerc. It was designated a monument historique by the French government in 1975.

== History ==
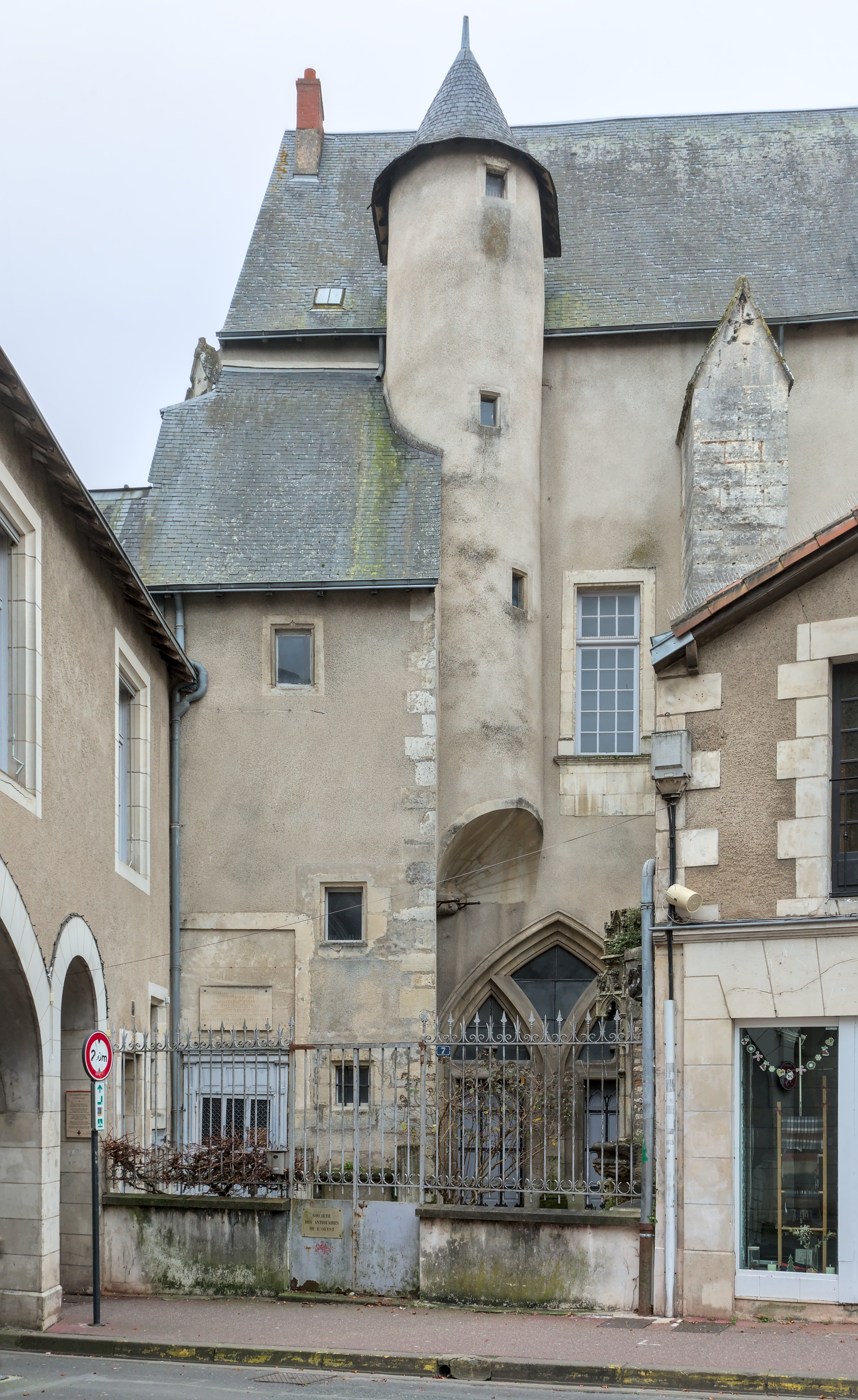
L'Échevinage (alderman's office)

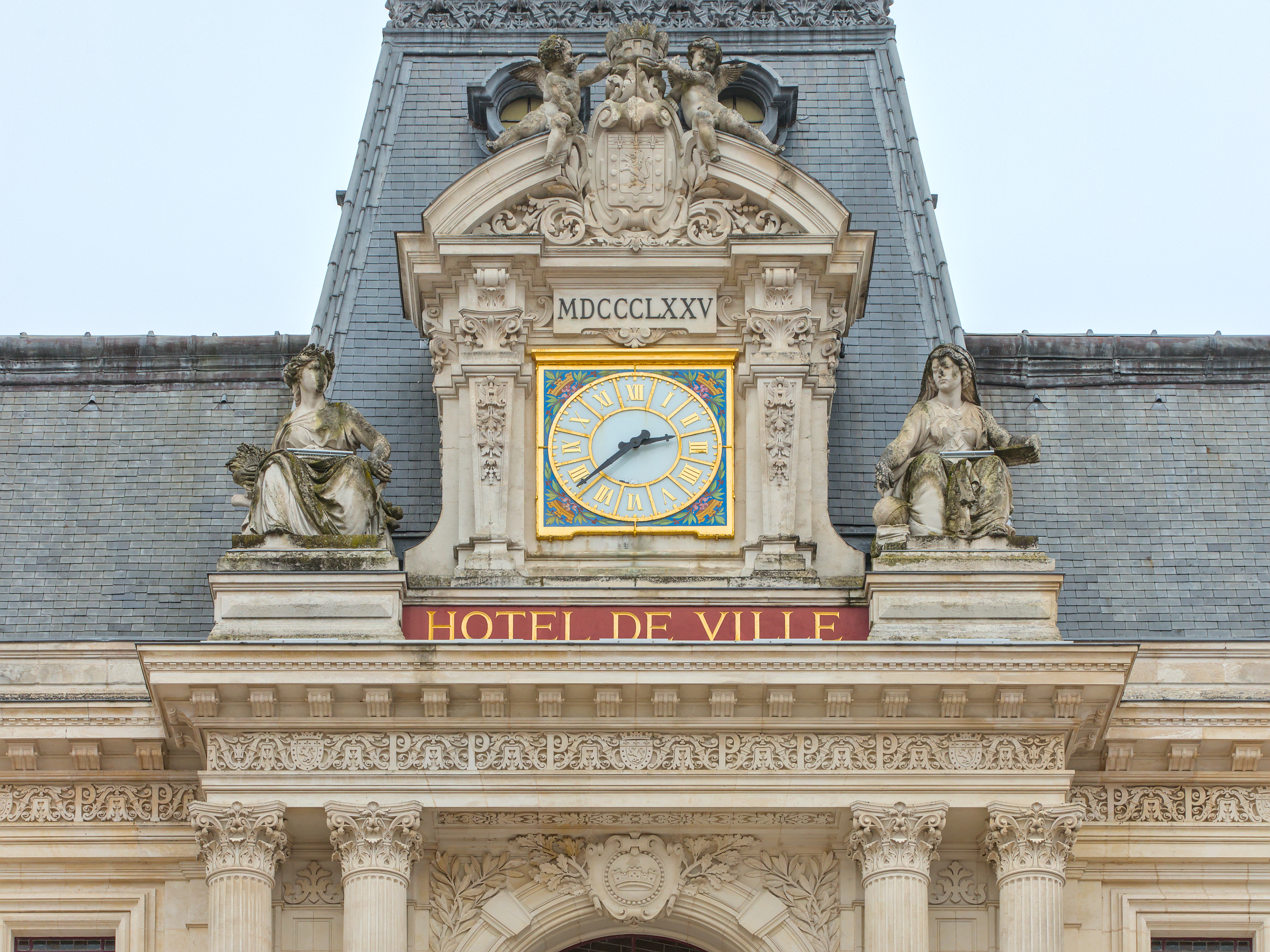
The pediment

The first municipal building in Poitiers was the alderman's office in Rue Paul Guillon which was completed in the 15th century.

Following significant population growth in the mid-19th century, largely associated with the train services arriving at the newly completed Poitiers station, the council decided to redevelop the city centre. The master plan, prepared by Georges-Eugène Haussmann envisaged a triumphal route, the Rue Victor Hugo, leading up to a new town hall. Construction of the new building started in 1869 but was delayed by the Franco-Prussian War. The new building was designed by Antoine-Gaetan Guérinot in the Second Empire style, built in ashlar stone and was completed in 1875.

The design involved a symmetrical main frontage of nine bays facing onto Place du Maréchal-Leclerc with the end bays slightly projected forward as pavilions. The central bay, which was also slightly projected forward, featured a round headed doorway with a moulded surround and an elaborate keystone; on the first floor, there was a round headed window with a moulded surround and a keystone and a balustraded balcony, flanked by pairs of Corinthian order columns supporting a frieze and a cornice with dentils. At roof level, there was a clock with a curved pediment, flanked by statues, and behind it, a mansard roof surmounted by a two-stage belfry. The wings of three bays each were fenestrated by round headed windows on the ground floor and by mullioned and transomed windows, flanked by Corinthian order pilasters, on the first floor. The end bays featured round headed doorways on the ground floor, and mullioned and transomed windows flanked by Corinthian order columns on the first floor, and were surmounted with mansard roofs with dormer windows. The elaborate frieze and blind medallions were sculpted by Paul-Albert Besnard and the statues on either side of the clock, representing agriculture and industry, were sculpted by Louis-Ernest Barrias.

Internally, the principal rooms were the Salle des Mariages (the wedding hall), the Salon d'Honneur (the ballroom) and the Salle du Blason (the council chamber). Two canvasses painted by Pierre Puvis de Chavannes were installed on the grand staircase in 1874: they depicting the French victory achieved by Charles Martel at the Battle of Tours in October 732 during the Umayyad invasion of Gaul, and Bishop Venantius Fortunatus reading poems to Queen Radegund at Holy Cross Abbey in the late 6th century. A portrait by Louis Charles Auguste Steinheil, depicting Eleanor of Aquitaine granting Poitiers a charter in 1199, was installed in the Salon d'Honneur.

Following the liberation of the town on 5 September 1944, during the Second World War, a member of the French Resistance, René Savatier, took control of the town hall and instructed that the French tricolour flag be hoisted on the roof. The Musée Municipal des Beaux-arts (Municipal Museum of Fine Arts), which had occupied the ground floor of the building, relocated to the Rue Saint Simplicien as the Musée Sainte-Croix (Saint Croix Museum) in December 1974.
