= Pirckheimer (surname) =

Pirckheimer is a surname. Notable people with the surname include:

- Caritas Pirckheimer, abbess in Nuremberg, modern-day Germany
- Hans II. Pirckheimer, patrician and counselor in Nuremberg
- Willibald Pirckheimer, German lawyer, author, and humanist
