= Maroveus =

Maroveus (French: Marovée) was the bishop of Poitiers in the late sixth century. He became bishop between 565 and 573, serving until sometime between 590 and 594.

Maroveus's predecessor, Pascentius, took over around 561 during the reign of Charibert I, but the date of the end of his episcopate is unknown. Pascentius was still bishop in 565, when Venantius Fortunatus dedicated his Life of Hilary of Poitiers to him. Maroveus became bishop before 573, while Sigebert I was king. His episcopate for the period 585–590 is well known because Gregory of Tours's History of the Franks.

According to Gregory of Tours, in 585, King Guntram demanded the submission of Poitiers, which he claimed had broken its oath to him. Maroveus declined on behalf of the people, whereupon the region was ravaged. When Guntram's envoys again demanded submission, Maroveus melted down a chalice to make coin to pay them off.

Maroveus was on poor terms with Queen Radegund and her religious foundation in Poitiers, Holy Cross Abbey. He refused to formally deposit the relic of the True Cross which she had acquired in the abbey and did not attend the ceremony when it was performed by Eufronius. He refused to officiate or even attend her funeral in 587, which was officiated instead by Gregory of Tours. His attitude probably stemmed from a belief that the abbey and its relic challenged his authority as bishop.

After Radegund's death, according to Gregory of Tours, Maroveus had his authority over the abbey confirmed by King Childebert II, but in 589, led by two royal women, Basina and Clotild, the nuns rebelled. When Maroveus gathered his fellow bishops Gundegisel of Bordeaux, Nicasius of Angoulême and Safarius of Périgueux in the church of Saint Hilary in Poitiers in order to censure the nuns, the bishops were attacked by a mob and forced to disperse. When Clotild imprisoned the Abbess Leubovera in 590, Maroveus threatened to "rouse the townsfolk and free" her, but in the event she was rescued by a royal official, Flavianus.

According to Gregory of Tours, around 589, when the burden of taxation at Poitiers was falling heavily on the poor because of outdated tax registers, Maroveus successfully pleaded for a reassessment from Childebert II, bringing much relief on the poor of the city. Around the same time, Gregory and Maroveus were charged by Childebert to mediate between Berthegund and Ingitrude, but while the former came before the bishops in Tours, the latter refused.

Maroveus seem to have been succeeded as bishop around 590 by Plato. He was certainly gone by 594.

== Bibliography ==
- Duchesne, Louis (1910). Fastes épiscopaux de l'ancienne Gaule. Vol. II: L'Aquitaine et les Lyonnaises (2nd ed.). Fontemoing.
- Edwards, Jennifer C. (2007). "Their Cross to Bear: Controversy and the Relic of the True Cross in Poitiers". Essays in Medieval Studies. 24: 65–77. doi:10.1353/ems.0.0000.
- Favreau, Robert, ed. (1988). "Liste des évèques". Le Diocèse de Poitiers. Beauchesne. pp. 341–342.
- Gregory of Tours (1974). The History of the Franks. Translated by Lewis Thorpe. Penguin Books.
- MacGonagle, Sara Hansell (1936). The Poor in Gregory of Tours: A Study of the Attitude of Merovingian Society Towards the Poor, as Reflected in the Literature of the Time (PhD diss.). Columbia University.
- Pon, Georges (1988). "Le clergé, les moines et les paysans au Haut Moyen Âge". In Robert Favreau (ed.). Le Diocèse de Poitiers. Beauchesne. pp. 14–33.
- Van Dam, Raymond (2011). Saints and Their Miracles in Late Antique Gaul. Princeton University Press.
- Wood, Ian N. (1994). The Merovingian Kingdoms, 450–751. Harlow: Longman.
