= Baudonivia =

French nun and hagiographer

Baudonivia writing

Baudonivia (fl. c. 600) was a nun and hagiographer at the convent of Holy Cross of Poitiers. Very little is known about her. She wrote a biography of Radegund, Queen, founder of Holy Cross, and saint. Scholars have noticed a marked difference in perspective between an earlier life of Radegund composed by Venantius Fortunatus, written from a close friend's perspective, and Baudonivia's, written from the perspective of a nun of Radegund's own convent.

== History ==
Baudonivia wrote her Vita Radegundis, a biography of the Frankish queen Radegund, founder of the Holy Cross abbey, at the request of the other nuns at Holy Cross.

Baudonivia wrote her life of Radegund sometime between 599 and 614 at Chelles Abbey, using a previous vita by Venantius Fortunatus and her own recollections of Radegund from her youth. She regarded her work as similar to half of a diptych. Baudonivia created a portrait of a devout yet politically shrewd woman who used her worldly power to sustain the monastery. Her work has been characterized as faithful to the picture painted by Venantius Fortunatus, but more significantly influenced by the ideology of Caesarius of Arles's Regula Virginum with the clear purpose of providing a model of sanctity for the nuns of her generation. The work is focused on the later stages of Radegund's life, when Radegund lived in a cell near Poitiers. The book also includes miracles attributed to Radegund's intercession.

== Commentary ==
Scholars have noted the thematic differences between the respective biographies of Venantius Fortunatus and Baudonivia. According to Professor Lynda L. Coon, Fortunatus's depiction of Radegund emphasizes her asceticism, while Baudonivia stresses her role as astute politician, her administrative achievements, and her traveling to collect relics and, most importantly, her efforts to gain a fragment of the True Cross from Byzantine Emperor Justin II.

Fortunatus wrote his part as someone who knew Radegund on a personal level, whereas Baudonivia presented Radegund as a role model. Venantius focuses on the humble life of Radegund, dedicated to caring for the poor, those suffering from leprosy, and the most derelict. Having become a tenacious penitent, she lived in a state of sanctity. That of Baudonivia tells a completely different story, giving the image of an indomitable woman with great mental autonomy who also reserved her inexhaustible energy for recreational or culinary activities, and spent her time not only in prayer and penance, but also in intense political activity, kept quiet by Venantius.

In the eleventh century, the abbesses of the Holy Cross convent were called to renegotiate their power. To maintain their challenged authority, they employed symbols of Radegund, based on the words of Baudonivia. Baudonivia herself inspired the artists creating stained-glass windows and manuscripts which decorated the abbey. .

== Bibliography ==
- Baudonivia. "Life of Radegund."
- Eckenstein, Lina. Woman under monasticism: chapters on saint-lore and convent life between A.D. 500 and A.D. 1500. University Press, 1896.
- Mulhberger, Steve. “Overview of Late Antiquity--The Sixth Century,” ORB Online Encyclopedia. <http://faculty.nipissingu.ca/muhlberger/ORB/OVC4S6.HTM>
- Wemple, Suzanne Fonay. "Scholarship in Women’s Communities" in Women in Frankish Society: Marriage and the Cloister, 500 to 900 : University of Pennsylvania Press, 1981.
- Smith, Julia M. H. (2009), "Radegundis Peccatrix: Authorizations of Virginity in Late Antique Gaul", in Rousseau, Philip; Papoutsakis, Manolis (eds.), Transformations of Late Antiquity: Essays for Peter Brown, Burlington: Ashgate, pp. 303–26, ISBN 0-7486-1110-X
- Edwards, Superior Women. Oxford: Oxford University Press. 2019
