= Eufronius =

6th-century cleric and bishop of Tours

Eufronius or Euphronius was the eighth Bishop of Tours; he served from 555 to 573, and was a near relative of Gregory of Tours.

When upon the death of Bishop Gunthar, King Chlothar's nominee declined appointment to the See, it remained vacant for ten months until the people and clergy elected Eufronius. He was a priest at Tours, from a family of senatorial rank. a grandson of Gregory of Langres, and a friend of Venantius Fortunatus. When Clothar learned of the election, he confirmed their choice.

In 552, the Abbaye de Sainte-Marie was founded near Poitiers by Frankish Queen, Radegund. It was the first monastery for women in the Frankish Empire. Radegund subsequently retired to the monastery, where she helped to care for the infirm. Upon her request, Byzantine Emperor Justin II sent the abbey a relic of the True Cross. When Bishop Maroveus of Poitiers refused to preside over its installation in the abbey, at Radegund's request, king Sigebert sent Eufronius to Poitiers to perform the ceremony. Sigebert also returned church lands that had been seized by King Charibert.

In 561 much of Tours burned down during the warfare that raged at that time. Eufronius rebuilt two of the churches at his own expense. According to Gregory, Eufronius predicted the death of Charibert.

Eufronius took part in the Council of Paris in 557, and presided over the Council of Tours in 567. The bishops of Brittany declined to attend, as Eufronius claimed authority over the Breton church. The council dealt mostly with church discipline. The bishops noted that some Gallo-Roman customs of ancestor worship were still being observed. Canon XXII decreed that anyone known to be participating in these practices was barred from receiving communion and not allowed to enter a church. The bishops of the Kingdom of Paris were particularly concerned about the Merovingian practice of seizing ecclesiastical properties in outlying areas in order to fund their internecine wars.

Eufronius was Bishop of Tours for eighteen years, and died at the age of seventy. He was succeeded by St. Gregory of Tours. Eufronius was either a cousin of Gregory's mother's or her brother. He is mentioned in the Roman Martyrology on August 4.
