= Hervé Lhommedet =

French footballer (born 1973)

Personal information
- Full name: Hervé Lhommedet
- Date of birth: September 28, 1973 (age 53)
- Place of birth: Poitiers, France
- Height: 1.83 m (6 ft 0 in)
- Position: Defender

Senior career*
Years	Team	Apps	(Gls)
1995–2000	Chamois Niortais	71	(1)
2000–2001	Saintes	?	(?)
- * Club domestic league appearances and goals

Hervé Lhommedet (born September 28, 1973) is a former professional footballer who played as a defensive midfielder.

== See also ==
- Football in France
- List of football clubs in France
