= Lina Eckenstein =

German-British polymath and historian

- Born: Lina Dorina Johanna Eckenstein; 23 September 1857; Islington, England
- Died: 4 May 1931 (aged 73); Great Missenden, England
- Occupations: researcher, teacher, translator, writer

Lina Dorina Johanna Eckenstein (23 September 1857 – 4 May 1931) was a British polymath and historian who was acknowledged as a philosopher and scholar in the women's movement.

== Life ==
Eckenstein's father was a Jewish socialist from Bonn who had fled Germany following the failed revolution of 1848. Eckenstein was born in Islington, London, in 1857; the highly independent mountaineer Oscar Eckenstein was her younger brother. Eckenstein had a large range of languages which she is thought to have obtained at some educational facility in Switzerland or Germany.

She came to notice after joining a club started by the mathematician (and in time eugenicist) Karl Pearson which allowed middle-class radicals to talk about sex. The club, called the Men and Women's Club, operated during the late 1880s. Eckenstein was seen as a "new woman" and she presented studies she had made of the sexual relations of the Romans and of Swiss men and women during the Reformation. The club discussed feminist and liberal issues including ending any state legal interference in prostitution and whether motherhood should be reimbursed. Karl and Maria Pearson and their children, Sigrid, Helga, and Egon, were to permanently remain as Eckenstein's friends.

== Scholar ==
She supported herself financially with conducting research, proofreading, teaching, and translation. She undertook significant work on Albrecht Dürer for Pearson's friend Martin Conway for which she was credited on the title page of his book. Eckenstein's family were German, but she also knew French and Italian, Middle High German, Middle English, and classical and medieval Latin and European history. This scholarly achievement made her overqualified to be a governess, but she became the governess to Margery Corbett. In 1896 she published Woman Under Monasticism: Chapters on Saint-Lore and Convent Life between A.D. 500 and A.D. 1500, which she dedicated to Karl and Maria Pearson. This work drew a large number of sources together, some that she translated, to argue that many of the aspirations that women sought in the twentieth century were in some ways achieved by women in religious institutions a thousand years before. She describes the rebellion of the nuns at Poitiers after the death of Radegund. For two years the nuns refused to accept a new abbess who had been appointed by the male Catholic hierarchy. Eckenstein's work is credited with recovering Caritas Pirckheimer from historic obscurity. This work is thought to be the most scholarly of her publications despite the inclusion of some doubtful or mythical German history. It was read by the late nineteenth century English novelist George Gissing in July 1896.

== Traveller ==
In 1902 she walked through the upper Arno valley and published an account of her travels. The following year she began a new escapade, working with the archaeologists Hilda and Flinders Petrie in Egypt. She took on the administrative role of running the excavations camp and ensuring that finds were catalogued correctly. She worked at excavations at Abydos, Saqqara, Serabit el-Khadim, and El Shatt. In the Osireion at Abydos, she copied the art on the wall. At the temple of King Seti, made a connection between some Egyptian art and a child's nursery rhyme. She was so intrigued by the connection between the 3,000-year-old cult picture and the story of the death of Cock Robin that she published a comparative study of nursery rhymes in 1906. In 1921 she published A History of Sinai which drew on her work with the Petries, tracing the history of the area back to before the Egyptians. Eckenstein was well-qualified to publish books on the Sinai, as she had trekked across it by camel with Hilda Petrie (c.1905) and a single guide. She published several other books that mixed fact with imagination. One of her books published in 1924, Tutankh-aten, was about the imagined childhood of Moses.

From 1908 she became more involved in the campaign to improve women's rights. As part of this, she was supporting her previous pupil, and now friend, Margery Corbett in Geneva in 1920. Margery was the secretary of the National Union of Women's Suffrage Societies. They both attended the International Women's Suffrage Alliance congress, where Eckenstein ensured that the proceedings were available in a variety of European languages.

She died on 4 May 1931 from exhaustion and chronic cystitis at Little Hampden, Great Missenden, Buckinghamshire.

== Legacy ==
After her death two further books were published: A Spell of Words in 1932 and The Women of Early Christianity in 1935. The former was dedicated to Sigrid, Helga and Egon Pearson, and argues that there are common roots for Indo-European culture.

== Works ==
- Woman under Monasticism: Chapters on Saint-Lore and Convent Life between A.D. 500 and A.D. 1500, 1896
- Life and art of Albrecht Dürer, 1902
- Through the Casentino, 1902
- Comparative Studies in Nursery Rhymes, 1906
- Moon cult in Sinai on the Egyptian Monuments, 1914
- A History of Sinai, 1921
- Tutankh-aten, 1924
- A Spell of Words: Studies in Language Bearing on Custom, 1932
- The Women of Early Christianity, 1935
