= Church of Sainte-Radegonde (Poitiers) =

Church of St. Radegund
- Église Sainte-Radegonde
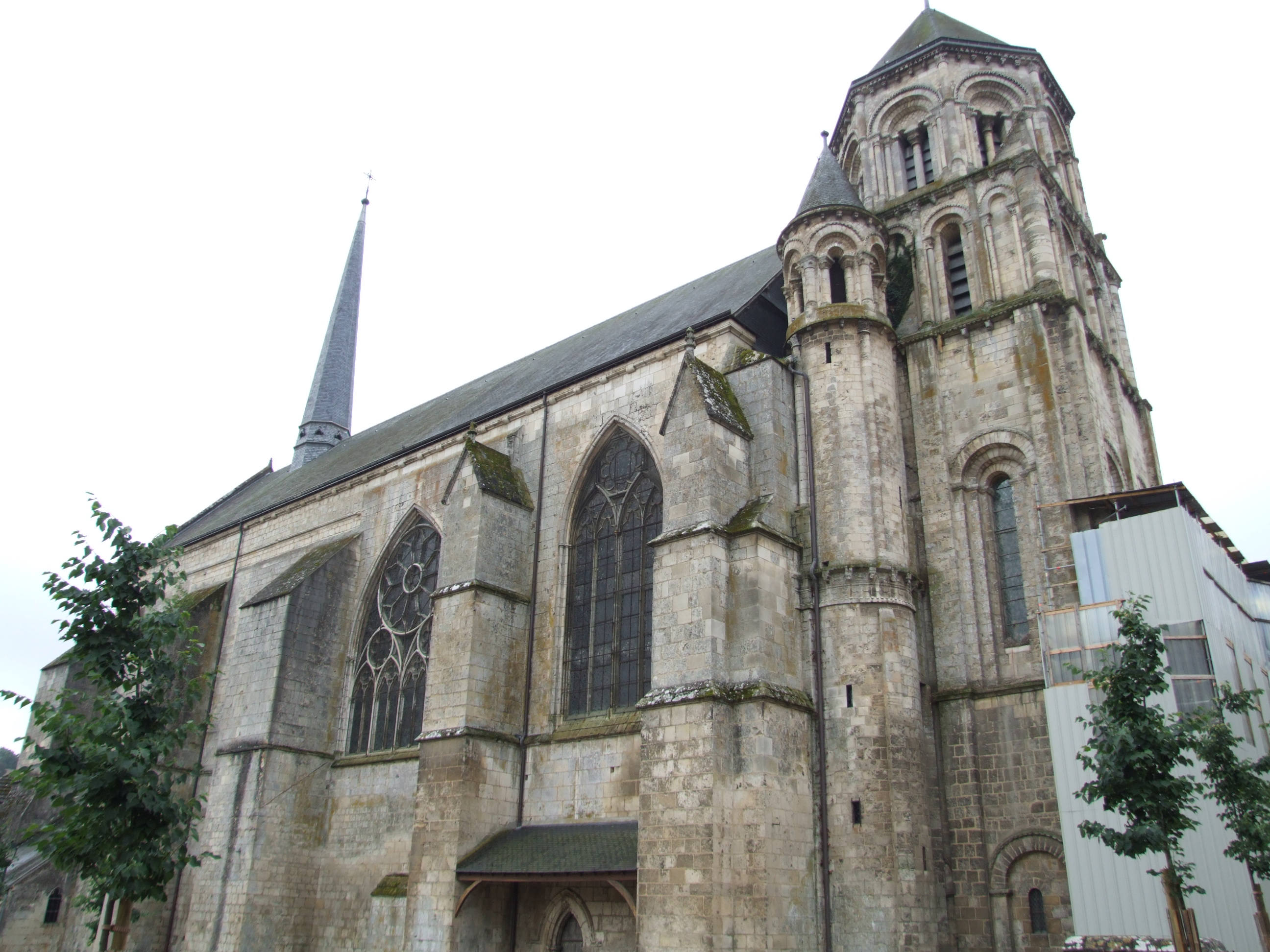
- Church of St. Radegund
- Church of St. Radegund
- 46°34′47″N 0°21′07″E
- Country: France
- Denomination: Catholic Church

History
- Former name: Chapel of St. Mary outside the Walls
- Status: Parish church
- Founded: 550s
- Founder: St. Radegund
- Dedication: Mary, mother of Jesus (till 587), St. Radegund (587-)
- Dedicated: 1099

Architecture
- Functional status: active
- Heritage designation: Monument historique
- Designated: 1862
- Architectural type: Collegiate church
- Style: Romanesque & Angevin Gothic
- Completed: 12th century

Administration
- Archdiocese: Poitiers

Clergy
- Archbishop: The Most Rev. Pascal Wintzer
- Pastor: The Rev. Frédéric Dacquet

The Church of Sainte-Radegonde (French: Église de Sainte-Radegonde) is a medieval Roman Catholic church in Poitiers, France, dating from the 6th century. It takes its name from the Frankish queen and nun, Radegund, who was buried in the church. Radegund was considered a saint and the church became a place of pilgrimage by those devoted to her heavenly intercession. The current church, constructed from the 11th to 12th centuries, was built in a combination of Romanesque and Angevin Gothic architectural styles.

== History ==
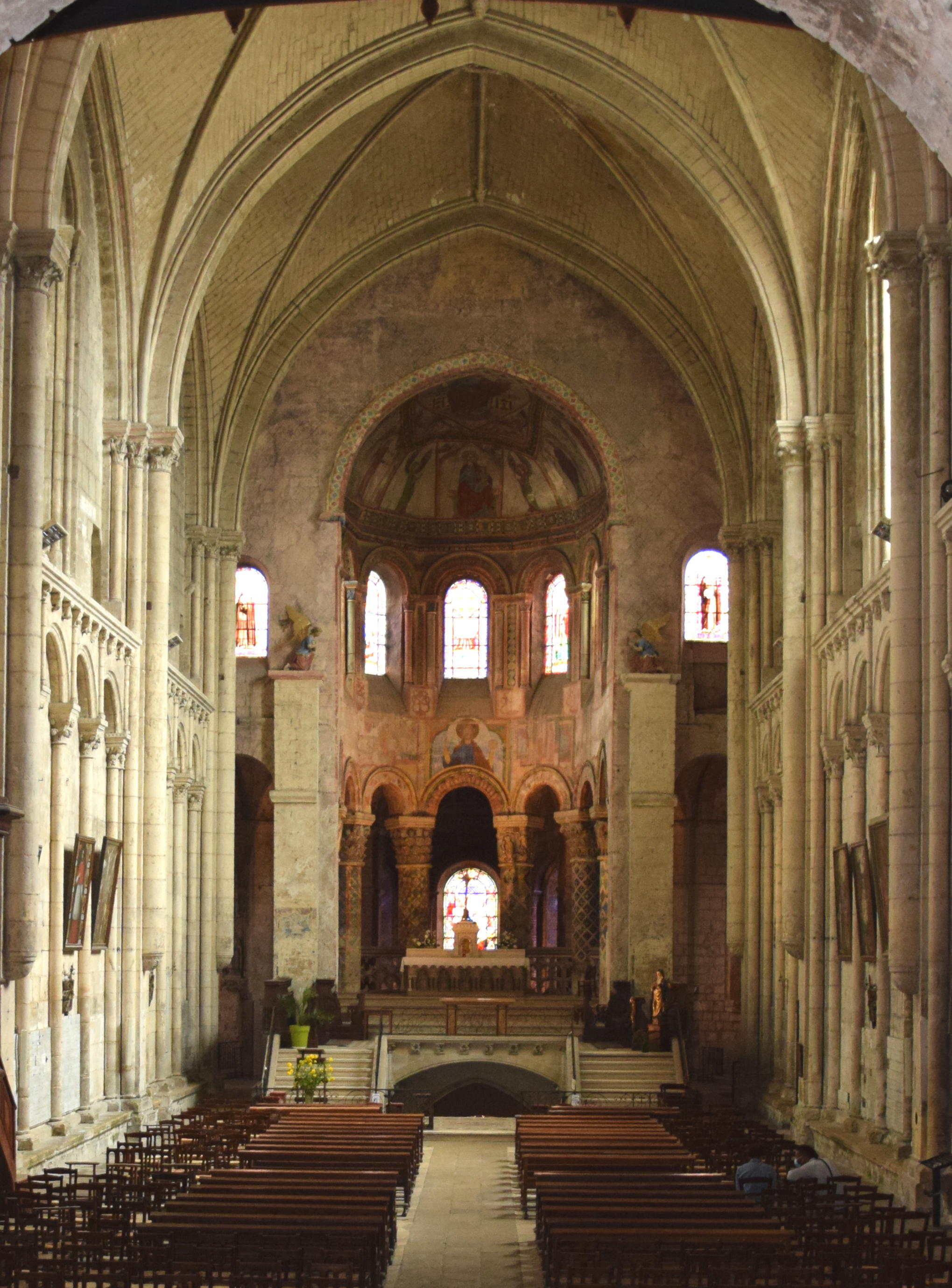
Angevin Gothic nave and Romanesque choir and ambulatory

The church was established as a mortuary chapel in the 6th century to hold the remains of the nuns of St. Mary Abbey, later the Abbey of the Holy Cross, which had been founded in Poitiers by Radegund in 552 as the first monastery for women in the Frankish Empire. Due to its function, the chapel was built outside the city walls, which gave it its initial name, the Church of St. Mary outside the Walls (French: Sainte-Marie-hors-les-murs). Upon Radegund's death and subsequent burial there in 587, however, the chapel was renamed to be placed under her patronage. In 955, the church was burned by Hugh the Great during the siege of Poitiers.

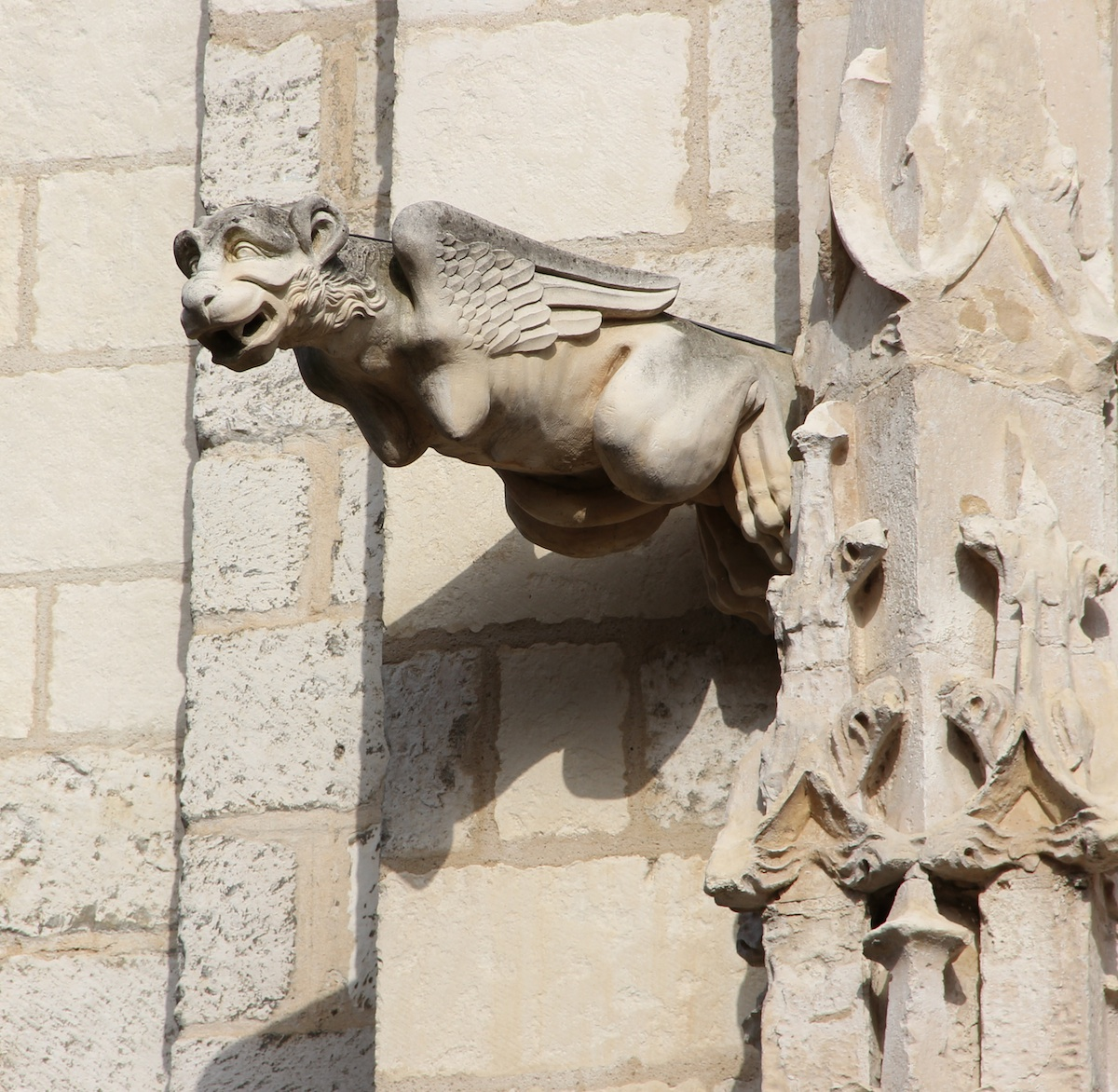
Gargoyle in the form of a female demon

The remains of the saintly foundress were exhumed by order of Abbess Béliarde in 1012 for public veneration, and the entire church was rebuilt after a major fire in 1083. The reconstruction expanded the structure, including both a chevet and the foundations of a bell tower when it was dedicated in 1099. By this time, the chapel had become both a parish and collegiate church, staffed by a community of canons whose prior was appointed by the abbess.

== Description ==
The church is built in the shape of a Latin cross. This was a style which became popular in the 11th century, particularly for pilgrimage shrines. It consists of a central nave with radiating chapels. This allowed for both private space for prayer by the clergy of the church and open space for the pilgrims visiting it.

=== Organ ===
The church has had a series of organs since the Middle Ages. After the devastation of the church during the French Revolution, it was not until 1894 that an organ was again installed in the church. Though it survived damage caused by bombardment during World War II, this organ was irreparably damaged by poorly done renovations in 1991. It was replaced in 1997 by an entirely new organ.

=== Architecture ===
The church comprises a low relief porch of the eleventh century, a Pieta seventeenth century and the capitals of the Romanesque choir. A series of 16 stained glass windows partially dating from the 13th century recounts the life of Radegund. They were restored in the 19th century.

== See also ==
- High medieval domes

== Sources ==
- Sainte-Radegonde, Poitiers' town hall website (in French)
- Gregory of Tours, Glory of the Confessors, translation by R. Van Dam (Liverpool, 1988)
- Gregory of Tours, Glory of the Martyrs; translated by Raymond Van Dam. Liverpool: Liverpool University Press, 2004.
- Gregory of Tours, History of the Franks; translation by L. Thorpe (Penguin, 1974: many reprints)
- Venantius Fortunatus, The Life of the Holy Radegund; translation by J. McNamara and J. Halborg
- Edwards, Jennifer C. Superior Women: Medieval Female Authority in Poitiers' Abbey of Sainte-Croix. Oxford: Oxford University Press, 2019.
- Kneepkens, C. H. (1986). "À propos des débuts de l'histoire de l'église-funéraire Sainte-Radegonde de Poitiers". Cahiers de Civilisation Médiévale (in French). 29–116. Translated by Pon, Ch.; Pon, Georges: 331–338.
- Labande-Mailfert, Yvonne & Robert Favreau, eds. Histoire de l’abbaye Sainte-Croix de Poitiers: Quatorze siècles de vie monastique. Poitiers: Société des Antiquaires de l’Ouest, 1986.
- Lillich, Meredith Parsons. The Armor of Light: Stained Glass in Western France, 1250–1325. Berkeley: University of California Press, 1994.
