= Sainte-Radegonde =

Sainte-Radegonde is the name of several communes in France named after Radegund:

- Sainte-Radegonde, Aveyron, in the Aveyron département
- Sainte-Radegonde, Charente-Maritime, in the Charente-Maritime département
- Sainte-Radegonde, Deux-Sèvres, in the Deux-Sèvres département
- Sainte-Radegonde, Dordogne, in the Dordogne département
- Sainte-Radegonde, Gers, in the Gers département
- Sainte-Radegonde, Gironde, in the Gironde département
- Sainte-Radegonde, Saône-et-Loire, in the Saône-et-Loire département

== Former communes ==
- Sainte-Radegonde, Charente, in the Charente département, now part of Baignes-Sainte-Radegonde
- Sainte-Radegonde, Creuse, in the Creuse département, now part of Budelière
- Sainte-Radegonde-en-Touraine, in the Indre-et-Loire département, now part of Tours
- Sainte-Radegonde, Somme, in the Somme département, now part of Péronne, Somme

=== See also ===
- Sainte-Radégonde, in the Vienne département
- Sainte-Radégonde-des-Noyers, in the Vendée département
