= Holy Cross Abbey (Poitiers) =

Benedictine nunnery in Saint-Benoît, Vienne, France

Abbey of the Holy Cross
- Abbaye de Sainte-Croix
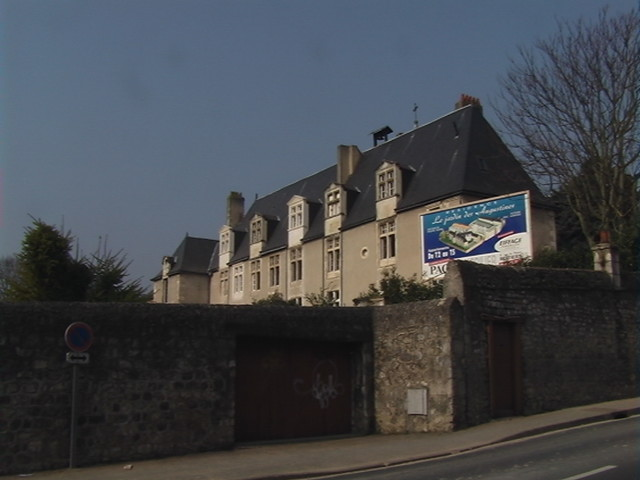
- Walls of the pre-Revolutionary abbey buildings, dating from the 16th century

- Location within Poitou-Charentes

Monastery information
- Other name: Abbey of Saint Mary
- Order: Benedictine
- Denomination: Roman Catholicism
- Established: 552
- Disestablished: c. 1569
- Dedication: Feast of the Holy Cross
- Dedicated: 567
- Diocese: Poitiers

People
- Founder: Saint Agnes
- Important associated figures: Saint Radegund, Saint Aredius, Saint Eufronius

Architecture
- Status: Destroyed
- Style: Merovingian

Site
- Location: Saint-Benoît, Poitiers
- Country: France
- Coordinates: 46.5798°N 0.3519°E
- Website: www.abbayesaintecroix.fr

The Abbey of the Holy Cross was a French Benedictine nunnery founded in the 6th century. Destroyed during the French Revolution, a new monastery with the same name was built in a nearby location during the 19th century for a community of Canonesses of St. Augustine of the Mercy of Jesus.

== History ==
=== Founding ===
The abbey was founded in 552 by the Frankish queen, Radegund (French: Radegonde) as the first monastery for women in the Frankish Empire in what is now the village of Saint-Benoît, Vienne. It was founded due to a threat of excommunication of her husband, King Chlothar I, King of the Franks, by Germain, the Bishop of Paris. To avoid this penalty, the king provided the bishop with the funds to acquire lands near the episcopal palace to construct the Abbey of St. Mary (French: Abbaye de Sainte-Marie), as it was originally called. As his third wife had failed to provide him an heir, the king allowed Radegund to become a nun in the new monastery.

The first abbess was Agnes of Poitiers, a former lady in waiting to the queen, who had refused to take this office for herself. The community initially followed the Regula virginum (Rule for virgins) written in 512 by the noted bishop Caesarius of Arles, who had written it for a group of women in his city who had wished to lead lives of greater asceticism.

The nunnery was renamed in 567 to the Abbey of the Holy Cross, when Radegond was given a gift by the Emperor of Byzantium of a fragment of the True Cross. As part of the ceremony of processing to the abbey with this sacred relic, she commissioned her friend, the Italian nobleman and religious poet Venantius Fortunatus, later to become bishop of the city, to write a poem to mark the occasion. For this, he produced the hymn Vexilla Regis, considered to be one of the most significant Christian hymns ever written, which is still sung for services on Good Friday.

=== Rebellion ===
In 589, an insurrection broke out in the community of nuns which became a scandal throughout the empire. Led by two royal princesses, Basina, daughter of Chilperic I and her cousin, Chlothild, a group of nuns left the abbey and took refuge in a nearby church. There they accused the abbess, Leubovère, of both excessive rigor in her treatment of the nuns under her charge and of immorality. The group recruited a large group of men to seize the abbess and confine her. Intense fighting took place in the abbey which lasted for days.

The turmoil only subsided when royal envoys intervened, restoring a fragile order and dragging the ringleaders before King Childebert II to answer for their actions. Most were excommunicated, yet even years after the rebellion was quelled, rumors of hidden grievances and secret alliances lingered, casting a long shadow over the abbey's reputation.

=== Modern era ===
The abbey was heavily damaged during the French Wars of Religion during the 16th century. What does remain of the ancient abbey buildings dates from that era. They were constructed under Abbess Charlotte-Flandrina of Orange-Nassau, daughter of William the Silent, who had converted to Catholicism and entered the abbey as a nun.

Most of the ancient abbey buildings were destroyed in the course of the French Revolution.

== Abbey buildings ==
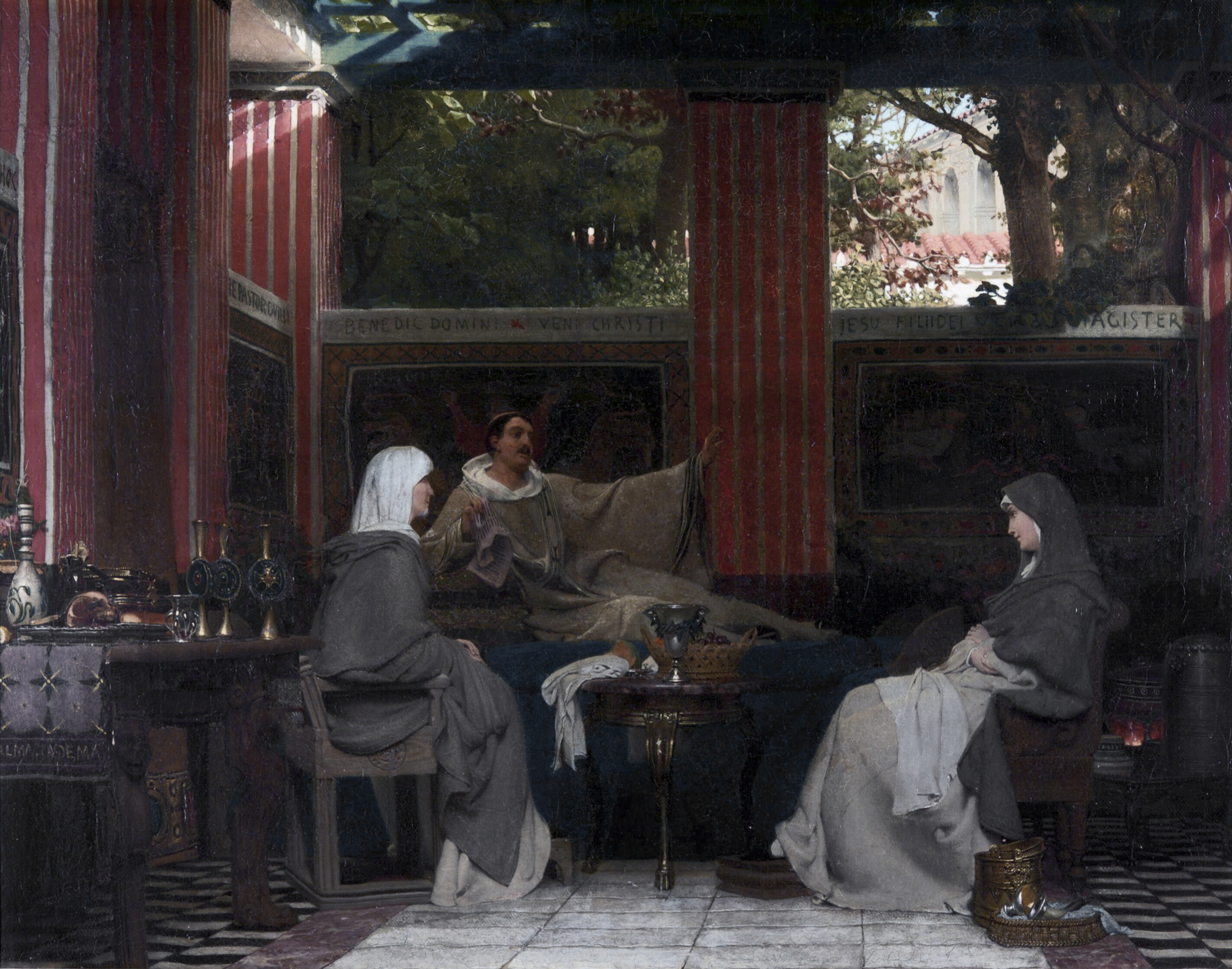
Venantius Fortunatus reading his poems to Radegund by Lawrence Alma-Tadema (1862).

=== Church of St. Radegund ===
In keeping with Roman law, a mortuary chapel for the remains of the nuns of the abbey was built outside the walls for reasons of sanitation. Originally called the Chapel of St. Mary outside the Walls, it was renamed the Church of St. Radegund in 587 after the former queen was buried there and began to be greatly revered as a saint. King Pepin I of Aquitaine was buried there in 838. Rebuilt in the 11th century within walls built by Eleanor of Aquitaine, the chapel continues to operate as a parish church today.

=== Pas de Dieu Chapel ===
Excavations during the early 20th century uncovered the remains of the monastic cell of Radegund and her private chapel, which were destroyed during the Revolution. It takes its modern name, the Chapel of God's Footprint, from a vision the saint had of Christ while she was approaching her death. In it, she described seeing Jesus, who told her, "You are the pearl in my crown." A footprint was left in the stone floor of her cell in the course of the vision. After the Revolution, the stone was placed in the Church of St. Radegund, where it can be seen today.

== Relics ==
The Augustinian canonesses today still preserve several items of note from the ancient abbey. Most significant of these is the relic of the True Cross. Additionally there is the ivory Reading desk of St. Radegund.

== Sources ==
- Gregory of Tours, Glory of the Confessors, translation by R. Van Dam (Liverpool, 1988)
- Gregory of Tours, Glory of the Martyrs; translated by Raymond Van Dam. Liverpool: Liverpool University Press, 2004.
- Gregory of Tours, History of the Franks; translation by L. Thorpe (Penguin, 1974: many reprints)
- Venantius Fortunatus, The Life of the Holy Radegund ; translation by J. McNamara and J. Halborg
- Lina Eckenstein, Woman Under Monasticism: Chapters on Saint-Lore and Convent Life between A.D. 500 and A.D. 1500, Cambridge: Cambridge University Press, 1896.
- Edwards, Jennifer C. Superior Women: Medieval Female Authority in Poitiers' Abbey of Sainte-Croix. Oxford: Oxford University Press, 2019.
- Labande-Mailfert, Yvonne & Robert Favreau, eds. Histoire de l’abbaye Sainte-Croix de Poitiers: Quatorze siècles de vie monastique. Poitiers: Société des Antiquaires de l’Ouest, 1986.
- Hahn, Cynthia. Portrayed on the Heart: Narrative Effect in Pictorial Lives of Saints from the Tenth through the Thirteenth Century. Berkeley: University of California Press, 2001.
