= Vexilla regis prodeunt =

Christian Hymn

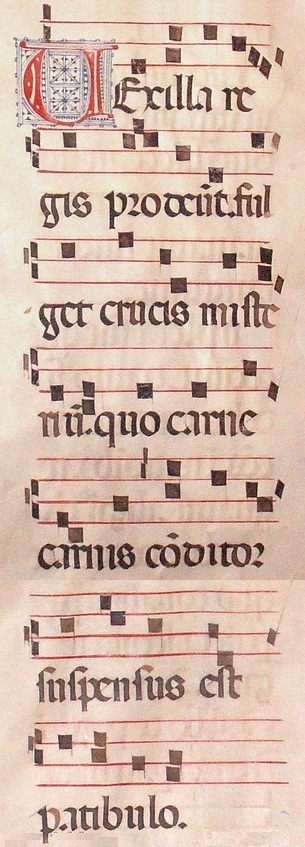
Detail from a choirbook leaf, Italy c.1400-1420

Vexilla regis prodeunt (Ecclesiastical Latin: [vɛɡˈzilːa ˈrɛːd͡ʒis]; often known in English translation as The Royal Banner Forward Goes) is a Latin hymn in long metre by the Christian poet and saint Venantius Fortunatus, Bishop of Poitiers. It takes its title from its incipit.

In modern English usage, it is sung to a variety of tunes, although the original plainsong melody is the most common variant.

== History ==
The hymn was first sung for the procession (on November 19, AD 569) of a relic of the True Cross, that was sent by Byzantine Emperor Justin II from the East at the request of St. Radegunda, and was carried in great pomp from Tours to her monastery of Saint-Croix at Poitiers.

Its original processional use is commemorated in the Roman Missal on Good Friday, when the Blessed Sacrament is carried in procession from the Repository to the High Altar. Its principal use is in the Divine Office, with the Roman Breviary assigning it to Vespers from the Saturday before Passion Sunday daily to Maundy Thursday, and to Vespers of the Feast of the Exaltation of the Holy Cross (September 14), and in the pre-Vatican II Breviary also for the Feast of the Finding of the True Cross (May 3) and the Triumph of the Holy Cross (kept in various places on July 16).

== Textual variations ==
Vexilla Regis prodeunt sung to the original plainsong melody

Originally the hymn comprised eight stanzas. In the tenth century, stanzas 7 and 8 were gradually replaced by new ones (O crux ave, spes unica, and the doxology, Te summa Deus trinitas), although they were still retained in some places.

In the seventeenth century the correctors of the Breviary under Urban VIII revised the whole hymn in the interest of classical prosody. The Commission on Plain Chant under Pius X restored the ancient form of the text. The Graduale Romanum (1908) gives only the ancient form of the hymn, while the Antiphonary (1912) gives only the revised form. The Processionale (1911) gives both forms.

There exist multiple variants of the common English translation, originally by John Mason Neale in 1851.

Original text (strophes 1, 6 & 7)

Vexilla regis prodeunt:
Fulget crucis mysterium
Quo carne carnis conditor,
Suspensus est patibulo.

O Crux ave, spes unica,
Hoc passionis tempore
Auge piis justitiam,
Reisque dona veniam.

Te, summa Deus Trinitas,
Collaudet omnis spiritus:
Quos per crucis mysterium
Salvas, rege per saecula. Amen.

The Royal Banner forward goes,
The mystic Cross refulgent glows:
Where He, in Flesh, flesh who made,
Upon the Tree of pain is laid.

O Cross! all hail! sole hope, abide
With us now in this Passion-tide:
New grace in pious hearts implant,
And pardon to the guilty grant.

Thee, mighty Trinity! One God!
Let every living creature laud;
Whom by the Cross Thou dost deliver,
O guide and govern now and ever! Amen.

Revised text (strophes 1, 6 & 7)

Vexilla Regis prodeunt:
Fulget Crucis mysterium,
Qua vita mortem pertulit,
Et morte vitam protulit.

O Crux ave, spes unica,
Hoc Passionis tempore
Piis adauge gratiam,
Reisque dele crimina.

Te, fons salutis Trinitas,
Collaudet omnis spiritus:
Quibus Crucis victoriam
Largiris, adde praemium. Amen.

Abroad the Regal Banners fly,
Now shines the Cross's mystery;
Upon it Life did death endure,
And yet by death did life procure.

Hail, Cross, of hopes the most sublime!
Now in this mournful Passion time,
Grant to the just increase of grace,
And every sinner's crimes efface.

Blest Trinity, salvation's spring,
May every soul Thy praises sing;
To those Thou grantest conquest
By the holy Cross, rewards apply. Amen.

"Vexilla" has been interpreted symbolically to represent baptism, the Eucharist, and the other sacraments. Clichtoveus explains that as vexilla are the military standards of kings and princes, so the vexilla of Christ are the cross, the scourge, the lance, and the other instruments of the Passion "with which He fought against the old enemy and cast forth the prince of this world". Johann Wilhelm Kayser dissents from both, and shows that the vexillum is the cross which (instead of the eagle) surmounted, under Constantine, the old Roman cavalry standard. This standard became in Christian hands a square piece of cloth hanging from a bar placed across a gilt pole, and having embroidered on it Christian symbols instead of the old Roman devices.

The splendour and triumph suggested by the first stanza can be appreciated fully only by recalling the occasion when the hymn was first sung — the triumphant procession from the walls of Poitiers to the monastery with bishops and princes in attendance and with all the pomp and pageantry of a great ecclesiastical function. "And still, after thirteen centuries, how great is our emotion as these imperishable accents come to our ears!" (Pimont). There are about forty translations into English verse.

== Settings ==
Vexilla regis prodeunt appears in several modern hymnals. In the Church of England it was included (as "The Royal Banners Forward Go") in William Henry Monk's 1861 hymnbook, Hymns Ancient and Modern. In 1906 Percy Dearmer and Ralph Vaughan Williams included it in The English Hymnal, and the hymn was retained in the successor volume, The New English Hymnal (1986). In North America, the hymn is also published in Lutheran Worship. In German-speaking countries, the hymn can be found in the Catholic hymnal Gotteslob as "Der König siegt, sein Banner glänzt".

In addition to the original plainchant, the hymn is often sung to the hymn tune Gonfalon Royal, a melody composed for this hymn by Percy Carter Buck in 1913 to be sung at Harrow School in England, where he was director of music (Gonfalon is a Norman word for a banner).

== References in later works ==
Both words and tune are quoted in a number of musical works. Gounod took a very plain melody based on the chant as the subject of his "March to Calvary" in the oratorio "La rédemption" (1882), in which the chorus sings the text at first very slowly and then, after an interval, fortissimo. Franz Liszt wrote a piece for solo piano, Vexilla regis prodeunt, S185, and uses the hymn at the beginning and end of Via crucis (The 14 stations of the Cross), S53. Anton Bruckner composed a motet based on strophes 1, 6 and 7 of the text (1892). Gustav Holst used both the words and the plainchant melody of Vexilla regis in The Hymn of Jesus (1917).

Dante makes an early literary allusion in Inferno, where Virgil introduces Lucifer with the Latin phrase Vexilla regis prodeunt inferni. Dante's reference is itself later referenced in Walter M. Miller Jr.'s A Canticle for Leibowitz. Vexilla regis is mentioned in Stephen's discussion of his aesthetic theory in chapter V of A Portrait of the Artist as a Young Man by James Joyce.

In 1594, Jean de La Ceppède published a poem, ''Paraphrase de l'Hymne de la Passion 'Vexilla Regis''', in his ''Imitation of David's Penitential Psalms".

The poet-artist David Jones entitled a 1947 painting "Vexilla Regis", and mentions the hymn in his long poem The Anathemata: fragments of an attempted writing, and also in his book of essays "Epoch and Artist." In "A Commentary on The Anathemata of David Jones" by Rene Hague, the latter makes several references to the "Vexilla Regis."
