= Caritas Pirckheimer =

German nun and writer (1467–1532)

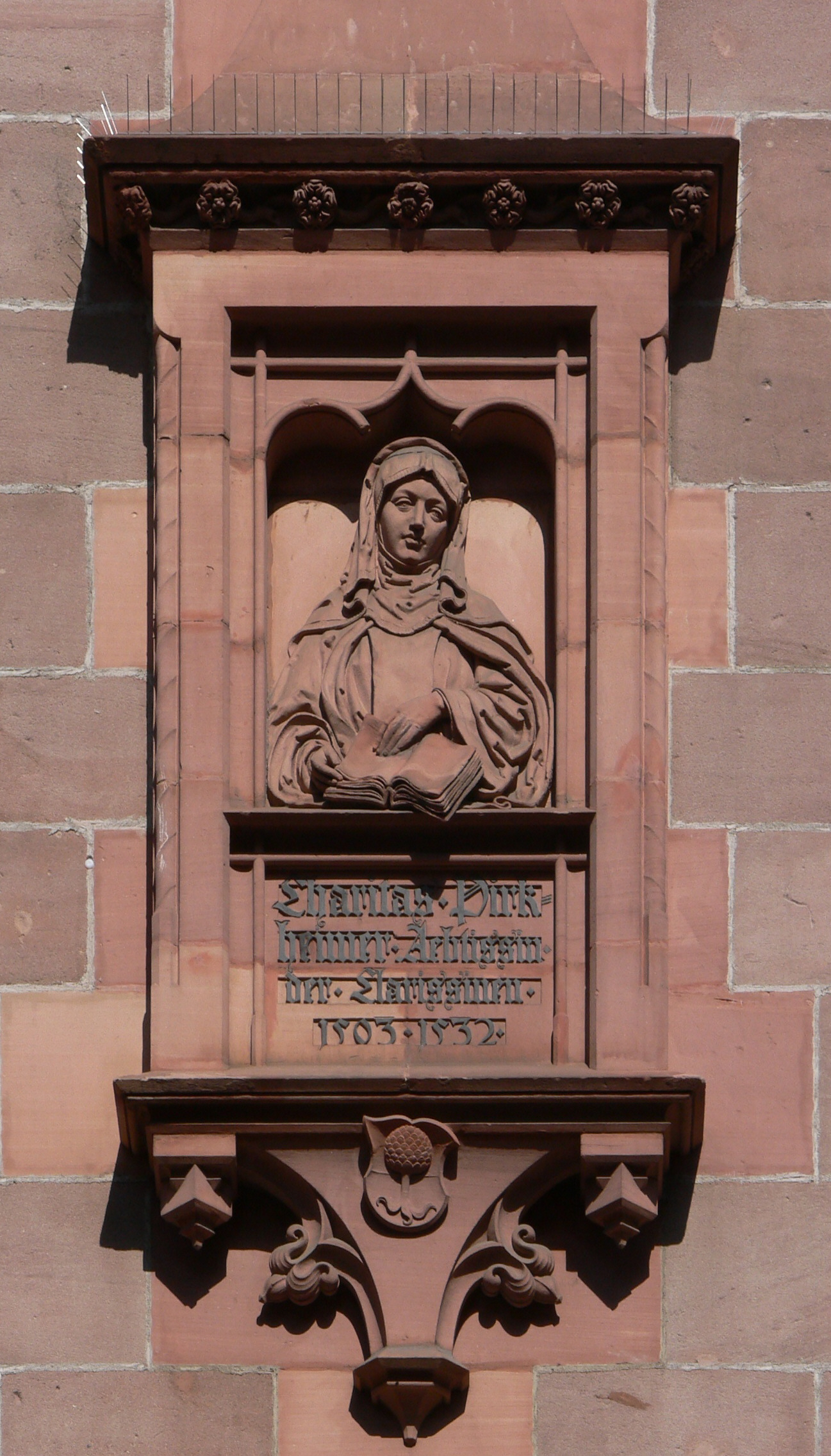
Caritas Pirckheimer by Balthasar Scmitt

Caritas Pirckheimer (21 March 1467 – 19 August 1532) was Abbess of Saint Clara's convent in Nuremberg at the time of the Reformation, which she opposed due to the threat posed by Martin Luther to Catholic houses of worship and religious buildings, including her own convent.

== Life ==
Born in Eichstätt as Barbara Pirckheimer, she was the eldest of 12 children of Dr Johannes Pirckheimer, nine of whom would survive to adulthood and one of whom was the prominent humanist Willibald Pirckheimer. Until her mother's death in 1488, she reportedly received a humanist education at home, where she became fluent in Latin. At the age of 12 she went to school at the Franciscan monastery of Saint Clara at Nuremberg. The monastery was known for its large library and encouraged study within the limits of the Franciscan Rule. Her learning was also encouraged by Nicholas Glassberger, the confessor to the convent and also a humanist scholar. When she was about 16 years old, she joined the order, taking the name of Caritas (or Charitas).

Caritas was in active correspondence with various figures involved in the humanist movement, such as Sixtus Tucher. She was also in regular correspondence with her brother Willibald and through him was introduced to other prominent humanists. Willibald dedicated three books to Caritas, in which he praised her learning, although she framed herself as unworthy of the honour. Despite being widely praised for her learning, authorities viewed Caritas as a threat and she was ordered to stop her Latin writing.

The Reformation took place quickly in Nuremberg and by 1525 the local authorities had taken significant control of monasteries. Already in her fifties at the time, Sister Caritas apparently received support in her struggle for the survival of the monastery from Philipp Melanchthon, formerly a close friend of Luther. They met at the end of 1525 and Caritas was able to convince him to leave nunneries in peace. Caritas utilised her extensive knowledge and the sources available to her, to argue against the efforts to close her convent.

She had maintained a chronicle during her abbacy of events at the monastery during the period of upheaval (1524–1528), "including letters to and from the city council and written transcripts of conversations. Later a final section was added, perhaps written after her death but including passages from Caritas' later letters." She also wrote letters to Conrad Celtis, who called her the new Hrotsvitha. She died in Nuremberg, aged 65. The fate of the convent, as it transpires, was that the women of Saint Clara's were allowed to stay in the monastery until their deaths but no novices were to be received. By 1591 the monastery and cloister had ceased to exist as Catholic houses of worship.

In her book Chapters on Saint-Lore and Convent Life between A.D. 500 and A.D. 1500 (1896) Lina Eckenstein drew the attention of modern readers to the life and achievements of Caritas Pirckheimer.
