= Hans II. Pirckheimer =

Hans II. Pirckheimer, also Pirckamer or Birkheimer (* around 1343; † 16 December 1400 in Nuremberg), was a Nuremberg patrician and councilor.

== Life ==
Hans Pirckheimer was the son of Hans I. Pirkheimer and Anna von Gundelfingen. His brother was Konrad Pirckheimer and his half-brothers Hanns im Hoff and Heinrich Imhof. The family came from Lauingen in the Donau-Ries. They made money through long-distance trade in Nuremberg. He was named to the Greater Council. He was married to Katharina Graser and Katharina Teufel.
