= Radegund =

Christian saint, Thuringian princess, and Frankish queen

Saint Radegund
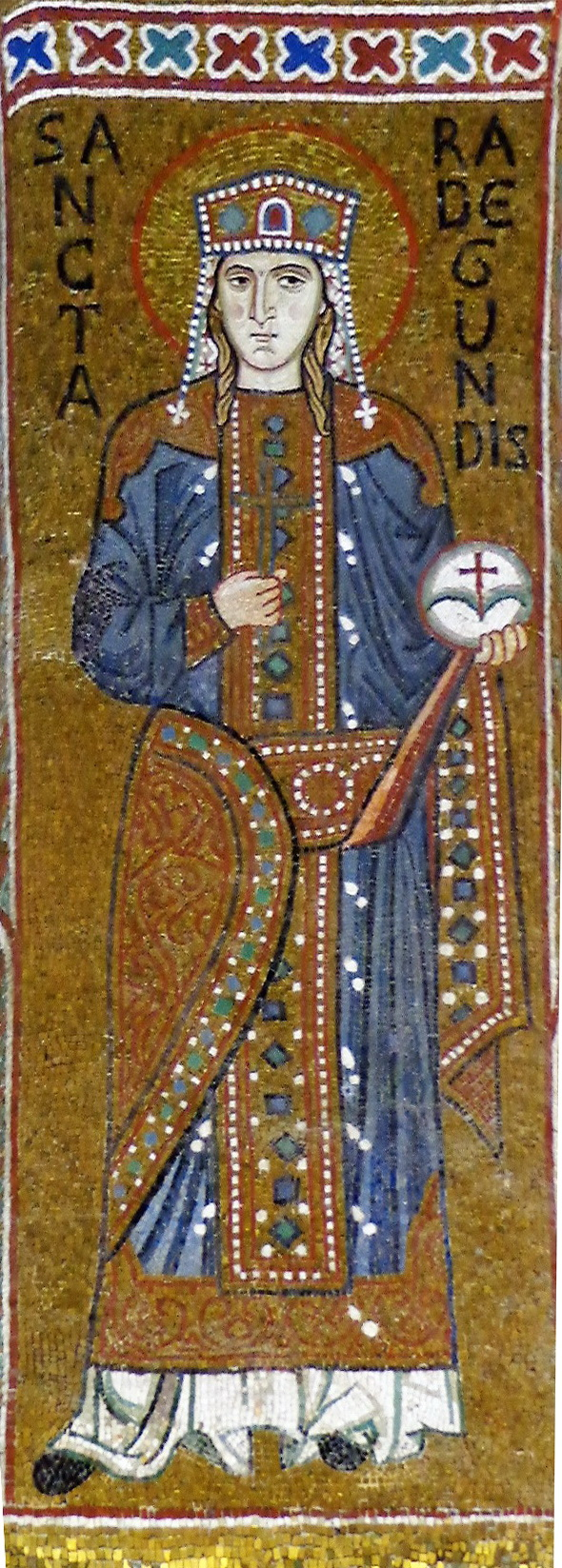
- Mosaic of Radegund in the Cappella Palatina in Palermo
- Born: c. 520; Thuringian tribes
- Died: 13 August 587 (aged 66–67); Abbey of the Holy Cross, Poitiers, Aquitaine, Kingdom of the Franks
- Venerated in: Roman Catholic Church; Eastern Orthodox Church
- Major shrine: Church of St. Radegonde, Poitiers, Vienne, France
- Feast: 13 August
- Attributes: crowned; mantle with fleurs de lys
- Patronage: Jesus College, Cambridge

Radegund (Latin: Radegundis; also spelled Rhadegund, Radegonde, or Radigund; c. 520 – 13 August 587) was a Thuringian princess and Frankish queen, who founded the Abbey of the Holy Cross at Poitiers. She is the patroness saint of several churches in France and England and of Jesus College, Cambridge (whose full name is "The College of the Blessed Virgin Mary, Saint John the Evangelist and the glorious Virgin Saint Radegund, near Cambridge").

== Life ==
Radegund was born about 520 to Bertachar, one of the three kings of the German land Thuringia. Radegund's uncle, Hermanfrid, killed Bertachar in battle, and took Radegund into his household. After allying with the Frankish King Theuderic, Hermanfrid defeated his other brother Baderic. However, having crushed his brothers and seized control of Thuringia, Hermanfrid reneged on his agreement with Theuderic to share sovereignty.

In 531, Theuderic returned to Thuringia with his brother Clotaire I (also known as Chlothar). Together they defeated Hermanfrid and conquered his kingdom. Clotaire I also took charge of Radegund, taking her back to Merovingian Gaul with him. He sent the child to his villa of Athies in Picardy for several years, before marrying her in 540.

Radegund was one of Clotaire I's six wives or concubines (the other five being Guntheuc who was the widow of his brother Chlodomer, Chunsina, Ingund, Ingund's sister Aregund and Waldrada the widow of Clotaire's grand-nephew Theudebald). She had no children with him. Radegund was noted for her almsgiving.

By 545 Radegund's brother was the last surviving male member of the Thuringian royal family. Clotaire had him murdered. Radegund fled the court and sought the protection of the Church, persuading Medardus, the bishop of Noyon, to ordain her as a deaconess; she founded the monastery of Sainte-Croix in Poitiers c. 560, where she cared for the infirm. Radegund was widely believed to have the gift of healing.

Living under the Rule for Virgins of Caesarius of Arles—which Radegund had received from her niece, Caesaria—the nuns were required to be able to read and write, and to devote several hours of the day to reading the scriptures and copying manuscripts, as well as traditional tasks, such as weaving and needlework. This Rule strictly enclosed women, to the point that nuns of Sainte-Croix were unable to attend Radegund's funeral.

Her abbey was named for the relic of the True Cross that Radegund obtained from the Byzantine Emperor Justin II. Although the bishop Maroveus of Poitiers refused to install it in the abbey, at Radegund's request king Sigebert I sent Eufronius of Tours to Poitiers to perform the ceremony. To celebrate the relic and its installation into Sainte-Croix, Venantius Fortunatus composed a series of hymns, including the famous Vexilla Regis, considered to be one of the most significant Christian hymns ever written, which is still sung for services on Good Friday, Palm Sunday, as well as the Exaltation of the Holy Cross.

Radegund was a close friend of Junian of Maire; Junian and Radegund are said to have died on the same day, 13 August 587.

== Asceticism ==
Radegund was known for her ascetic behaviour and has been described as an "extreme ascetic". She followed a vegan diet, refusing all animal products. She ate nothing but legumes and green vegetables: neither fruit nor fish nor eggs.

Radegund also abstained from wine, mead and beer. During Lent she abstained from bread, oil, and salt, and only drank a little water. She acted against the advice of others who warned her that her extreme ascetism might make her ill. She bound her neck and arms with three iron circlets; her flesh was badly cut because of this. On one occasion she heated a brass cross and pressed it on her body.

== Literary connections ==
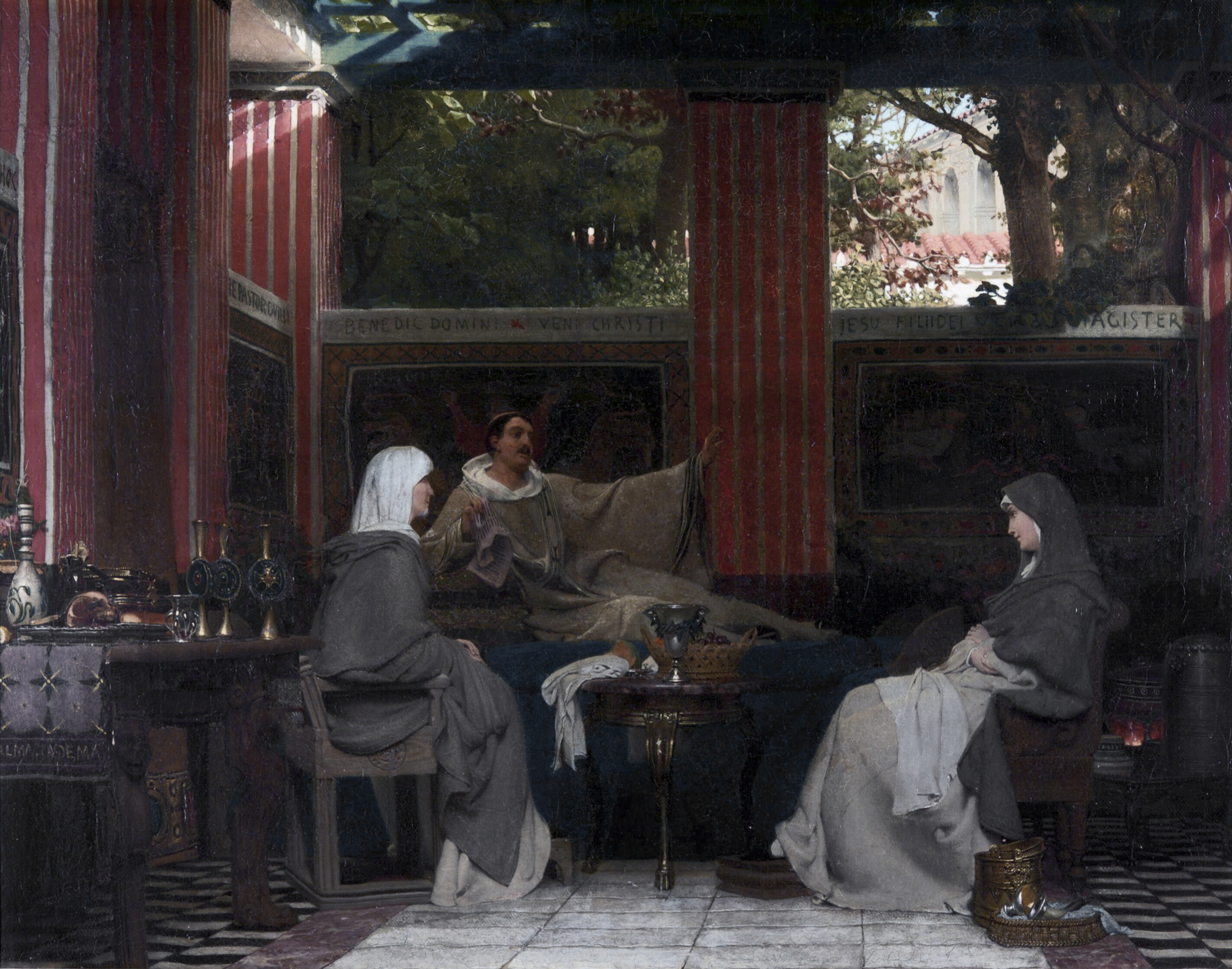
Venantius Fortunatus reciting his poems to Radegund and her abbess, by Lawrence Alma-Tadema

The poet Venantius Fortunatus and the bishop, hagiographer, and historian, Gregory of Tours, were close friends with Radegund and wrote extensively about her. She wrote Latin poems to Fortunatus on tablets that have been lost. The three of them seem to have been close and Fortunatus' relations with Radegund seem to have been based on friendship. There are two poems written in the voice of Radegund, De Excidio Thoringiae and Ad Artachin. While it has been proposed that Venantius wrote them, recent historians see her as the author.

Another biography was written by the nun Baudonivia following a rebellion at the abbey described by Gregory of Tours.

Radegund's funeral, which Venantius Fortunatus and Gregory of Tours attended, was three days after her death. She was buried in what was to become the Church of St. Radegonde in Poitiers. Her tomb can still be found in the crypt of that church, which remains the center of devotion to her. In the 1260s a church decoration program included stained-glass windows depicting Radegund's life. These were later largely destroyed by Huguenots.

In her book Woman Under Monasticism: Chapters on Saint-Lore and Convent Life between A.D. 500 and A.D. 1500 (1896) Lina Eckenstein drew the attention of modern readers to the rebellion of the nuns at Poitiers after the death of Radegund, during which, for a period of two years, they refused to accept a new abbess who had been appointed by the male hierarchy.

== Attributes ==
Radegund feeding the poor, from an illuminated manuscript of Fortunatus' Vita

She is typically depicted "with royal robes, crown, and sceptre" and nearby there are "wolves and wild beasts" which are tame in her presence. Also: "Crosier and book. Field of oats. White headdress, tunic with fleurs-de-lys, mantle with castles."

== Namesakes ==
Five English parish churches are dedicated to her, and she had a chapel in Old St Paul's Cathedral, as well as in Gloucester, Lichfield, and Exeter Cathedrals. St. Radegund's Abbey, near Dover, was founded in her honour in 1191, and Longleat Priory in Wiltshire was also dedicated to her. She is also a patron saint of Jesus College, Cambridge, which was founded on the site of the 12th century Priory of Saint Mary and Saint Radegund.

The St Radegund public house in Cambridge is named in her honour. St Rhadagund's Holiday and Conference Centre on the Isle of Wight is also named after her.

There are many places named Sainte-Radegonde in France.

Austria has two locations named after Saint Radegund. Sankt Radegund in Upper Austria is a municipality in the district of Braunau am Inn, situated at the western rim of the Innviertel region, where the Salzach river forms the border to the German state of Bavaria. Saint Radegund is also the namesake of Sankt Radegund bei Graz, a municipality in the district of Graz-Umgebung in the Austrian state of Styria.

Close to the ruins of the castle Mühlburg which can be dated back to 704 above the village of Mühlberg in Thuringia in Germany, the foundations of a chapel dedicated to St Radegund can be visited.

== Sources ==
- Gregory of Tours, Glory of the Confessors, translation by R. Van Dam (Liverpool, 1988)
- Gregory of Tours, Glory of the Martyrs; translated by Raymond Van Dam. Liverpool: Liverpool University Press, 2004.
- Gregory of Tours, History of the Franks; translation by L. Thorpe (Penguin, 1974: many reprints)
- Lina Eckenstein, Woman Under Monasticism: Chapters on Saint-Lore and Convent Life between A.D. 500 and A.D. 1500, Cambridge: Cambridge University Press, 1896.
- Edwards, Jennifer C. Superior Women: Medieval Female Authority in Poitiers' Abbey of Sainte-Croix. Oxford: Oxford University Press, 2019.
- Glenn, Jason. "Two Lives of Saint Radegund", in Jason Glenn (ed.), The Middle Ages in Texts and Texture: Reflections on Medieval Sources. Toronto: University of Toronto, 2012
- Labande-Mailfert, Yvonne & Robert Favreau, eds. Histoire de l’abbaye Sainte-Croix de Poitiers: Quatorze siècles de vie monastique. Poitiers: Société des Antiquaires de l’Ouest, 1986.
- Lillich, Meredith Parsons. The Armor of Light: Stained Glass in Western France, 1250–1325. Berkeley: University of California Press, 1994.
- Hahn, Cynthia. Portrayed on the Heart: Narrative Effect in Pictorial Lives of Saints from the Tenth through the Thirteenth Century. Berkeley: University of California Press, 2001.
- Smith, Julia M. H. "Radegundis peccatrix: authorizations of virginity in late antique Gaul", in Philip Rousseau and Emmanuel Papoutsakis (eds), Transformations of Late Antiquity: essays for Peter Brown Vol. 2 (Aldershot: Ashgate, 2009), 303–326.
- Jane Stevenson (2005). Women Latin Poets: language, gender, and authority, from antiquity to the eighteenth century. Oxford University Press.
