= Poitiers =

Prefecture and commune in Nouvelle-Aquitaine, France

Poitiers Poetàe (Poitevin–Saintongeais)
- Prefecture and commune
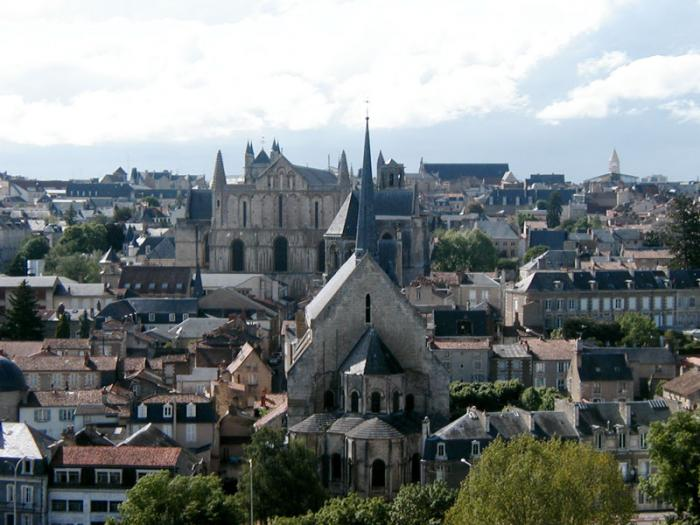
- Historic centre of Poitiers with Church of Saint-Radegund, Cathedral of Saint-Pierre and the Palace of Poitiers in the background

- Coat of arms
- Location of Poitiers
- Location within France Location within Nouvelle-Aquitaine
- Coordinates: 46°35′N 0°20′E
- Country: France
- Region: Nouvelle-Aquitaine
- Department: Vienne
- Arrondissement: Poitiers
- Canton: Poitiers-1, 2, 3, 4 and 5
- Intercommunality: CU Grand Poitiers

Government
  - Mayor (2020–2026): Léonore Moncond'huy (The Greens)
- Area^{1}: 42.11 km^{2} (16.26 sq mi)
- Elevation: 75 m (246 ft)
- Highest elevation: 144 m (472 ft)
- Lowest elevation: 65 m (213 ft)
- Population (2023): 89,916
  - Density: 2,135/km^{2} (5,530/sq mi)
- Demonym: Poitevin·e
- Time zone: UTC+01:00 (CET)
  - Summer (DST): UTC+02:00 (CEST)
- INSEE/Postal code: 86194 /86000
- Website: poitiers.fr (in French)
- ^{1} French Land Register data, which excludes lakes, ponds, glaciers > 1 km^{2} (0.386 sq mi or 247 acres) and river estuaries.

Poitiers (Note: /ˈpwɑːtieɪ/ PWAH-tee-ay, UK also /ˈpwʌtieɪ/ PWUT-ee-ay, US also /ˌpwɑːtiˈeɪ, pwɑːˈtjeɪ/ PWAH-tee-AY, pwah-TYAY; French: [pwatje]; Poitevin: Poetàe.) is a university city on the river Clain in west-central France. It is a commune, the capital of the Vienne department, part of the Nouvelle-Aquitaine region of France, and the historical center of Poitou Province. In 2022, the commune of Poitiers had a population of 89,427. Also in 2022, its conurbation had 133,833 inhabitants and its functional area 281,452 inhabitants. It is a city of art and history, still known popularly as the "Ville aux cent clochers" ("City of a hundred bell towers").

With more than 30,000 students, Poitiers has been a major university town since the creation of its university in 1431, having hosted world-renowned figures and thinkers such as René Descartes, Joachim du Bellay and François Rabelais, among others. The plaza of the town is picturesque; its streets including predominantly preserved historical architecture and half-timbered houses, especially religious edifices, commonly from the Romanesque period. The latter includes notably the 4th century baptistery of Saint-Jean (Baptistère Saint-Jean), the 7th century Merovingian underground chapel of the Hypogeum of the Dunes (L'Hypogée des Dunes), the Church of Notre-Dame-la-Grande (12th century), the Church of Saint-Porchaire (12th century) or Poitiers Cathedral (end of the 12th century) as well as the Palace of Poitiers, until recently a courthouse (12th century), the former palace of the Counts of Poitou, Dukes of Aquitaine, where the Dowager Queen of France and England Eleanor of Aquitaine held her "Court of Love".

The city's pedigree is associated with two major battles that took place in the area. The first, in 732, also known as the Battle of Tours (to avoid inevitable confusion with the second), saw the defending Frankish warhost commanded by Charles Martel defeat the belligerent expeditionary army of the Umayyad Caliphate led by Muslim general Abd al-Rahman al-Ghafiqi. The second battle, in 1356, a lionized military capstone was the Battle of Poitiers which was one of the focal battles of the Hundred Years' War. It saw the defeat of a larger French royal army by the English and the capture of King John II of France by the triumphant Prince of Wales Edward.

The Poitiers agglomeration, located halfway between Paris and Bordeaux, is home to the Futuroscope Technopole, which includes major public (CNED, Canopé, etc.) and private companies of national scope, as well as leading European research laboratories. With two million visitors annually, Futuroscope is the leading tourist site in Nouvelle-Aquitaine, and the third most popular amusement park in France after Disneyland Paris and the Puy du Fou.

== Geography ==
=== Location ===
The city of Poitiers is situated on the Seuil du Poitou, a shallow gap between the Armorican and the Central Massif. The Seuil du Poitou connects the Aquitaine Basin to the South to the Paris Basin to the North. This area is an important geographic crossroads in France and Western Europe.

=== Situation ===
Poitiers's primary site sits on a vast promontory between the valleys of the Boivre and the Clain. The old town occupies the slopes and the summit of a plateau that rises 130 feet (40 m) above the streams which surround, and hence benefits from a very strong tactical situation. This was an especially important factor before and throughout the Middle Ages.

== Inhabitants and demography ==
Inhabitants of Poitiers are referred to as Poitevins or Poitevines, although this denomination can be used for anyone from the Poitou province.

Historical population

Year	Pop.	±% p.a.
1793	18,284	—
1800	18,223	−0.05%
1806	21,465	+2.77%
1821	21,315	−0.05%
1831	23,128	+0.82%
1836	22,000	−1.00%
1841	22,376	+0.34%
1846	26,764	+3.65%
1851	29,277	+1.81%
1856	30,873	+1.07%
1861	30,563	−0.20%
1866	31,034	+0.31%
1872	30,036	−0.54%
1876	33,253	+2.58%
1881	36,210	+1.72%
1886	36,878	+0.37%
1891	37,497	+0.33%
1896	38,518	+0.54%
1901	39,886	+0.70%

Year	Pop.	±% p.a.
1906	39,302	−0.29%
1911	41,242	+0.97%
1921	37,663	−0.90%
1926	42,347	+2.37%
1931	41,546	−0.38%
1936	44,235	+1.26%
1946	48,546	+0.93%
1954	52,633	+1.02%
1962	62,178	+2.11%
1968	70,681	+2.16%
1975	81,313	+2.02%
1982	79,350	−0.35%
1990	78,894	−0.07%
1999	83,448	+0.63%
2007	89,253	+0.84%
2012	87,646	−0.36%
2017	88,291	+0.15%
2023	89,916	+0.30%

Source: EHESS and INSEE (1968-2023)

== Climate ==
The climate in the Poitiers area is mild with mild temperature amplitudes, and adequate rainfall throughout the year although with a drying tendency during summer. The Köppen Climate Classification subtype for this type of climate is "Cfb" (Marine West Coast Climate/Oceanic climate).

Climate data for Poitiers (PIS), elevation: 125 m (410 ft), 1991–2020 normals, extremes 1921–present
Month	Jan	Feb	Mar	Apr	May	Jun	Jul	Aug	Sep	Oct	Nov	Dec	Year
Record high °C (°F)	17.7 (63.9)	23.4 (74.1)	25.1 (77.2)	29.3 (84.7)	33.6 (92.5)	41.8 (107.2)	40.8 (105.4)	39.6 (103.3)	37.0 (98.6)	32.2 (90.0)	22.9 (73.2)	19.0 (66.2)	41.8 (107.2)
Mean daily maximum °C (°F)	8.2 (46.8)	9.6 (49.3)	13.4 (56.1)	16.3 (61.3)	20.0 (68.0)	23.7 (74.7)	26.1 (79.0)	26.3 (79.3)	22.5 (72.5)	17.5 (63.5)	12.0 (53.6)	8.7 (47.7)	17.0 (62.6)
Daily mean °C (°F)	5.2 (41.4)	5.6 (42.1)	8.4 (47.1)	10.8 (51.4)	14.4 (57.9)	17.9 (64.2)	19.9 (67.8)	20.0 (68.0)	16.6 (61.9)	13.0 (55.4)	8.4 (47.1)	5.6 (42.1)	12.2 (54.0)
Mean daily minimum °C (°F)	2.1 (35.8)	1.5 (34.7)	3.5 (38.3)	5.4 (41.7)	8.9 (48.0)	12.1 (53.8)	13.8 (56.8)	13.7 (56.7)	10.7 (51.3)	8.6 (47.5)	4.7 (40.5)	2.4 (36.3)	7.3 (45.1)
Record low °C (°F)	−17.9 (−0.2)	−17.3 (0.9)	−13.1 (8.4)	−5.6 (21.9)	−2.7 (27.1)	0.8 (33.4)	1.5 (34.7)	0.8 (33.4)	0.8 (33.4)	−6.5 (20.3)	−10.0 (14.0)	−16.5 (2.3)	−17.9 (−0.2)
Average precipitation mm (inches)	61.1 (2.41)	47.3 (1.86)	49.1 (1.93)	52.8 (2.08)	63.9 (2.52)	59.6 (2.35)	45.5 (1.79)	43.3 (1.70)	52.9 (2.08)	72.4 (2.85)	74.8 (2.94)	72.6 (2.86)	695.3 (27.37)
Average precipitation days (≥ 1.0 mm)	10.3	9.4	9.0	9.4	9.6	7.9	6.9	6.4	7.1	10.5	11.8	11.0	109.3
Average snowy days	2.6	2.8	1.9	0.5	0.0	0.0	0.0	0.0	0.0	0.0	0.9	2.2	10.9
Average relative humidity (%)	86	82	77	74	75	73	70	72	77	83	87	88	79
Mean monthly sunshine hours	70.3	101.6	157.8	183.1	213.2	232.5	250.5	244.3	199.5	130.8	86.6	70.5	1,940.6
Source 1: Meteociel
Source 2: Infoclimat.fr (relative humidity 1961–1990)

== History ==
=== Antiquity ===
Poitiers was founded by the Celtic tribe of the Pictones, who also gave it its name and was known as the oppidum of Lemonum prior to Roman influence. The name is said to have come from the Celtic word for elm, Lemo. After the Roman conquest the town became known as Pictavium, or later "Pictavis", after the original Pictones inhabitants themselves.

The city houses a series a of archaeological finds from the Roman-era. Until 1857, Poitiers hosted the ruins of a vast Roman Amphitheatre, which was larger than the Amphitheater of Nîmes. Furthermore, Roman baths built in the 1st century and demolished in the 3rd century, were uncovered near the amphitheater in 1877.

In 1879, a burial-place and tombs of a number of Christian martyrs were discovered on the heights to the south-east of the town. The names of some of the Christians had been preserved in paintings and inscriptions. Not far from these tombs is a huge Dolmen (the Pierre Levée), which is 6.7 metres (22 ft) long, 4.9 metres (16 ft) wide and 2.1 metres (7 ft) high, and around which the great fair of Saint Luke used to be held.

The Romans also built at least three aqueducts. This extensive ensemble constructions suggests Poitiers was a town of primary importance, possibly even the capital of the Roman province of Gallia Aquitania during the 2nd century.

As Christianity was made official and gradually introduced across the Roman Empire during the 3rd and 4th centuries due to Constantine I's influence. The first Bishop of Poitiers from 350 to 367, was Hilary of Poitiers or Saint Hilarius, who proceeded to evangelize the town. Exiled by Constantius II, he risked death to return to Poitiers as Bishop. In tandem, the first foundations of the Baptistère Saint-Jean can be traced to that era of open Christian conversion. This man was later named "Doctor of The Church" by Pope Pius IX.

In the 3rd century, a thick wall 6 m wide and 10 m high was built around the town. It was 2.6 km (2 mi) long and stood lower on the naturally defended east side and at the top of the promontory. Around this time, the town began to be known as Poitiers.

Fifty years later, Poitiers fell into the hands of the Visigoths, and became one of the principal residences of their royals. Visigoth King Alaric II was defeated by Clovis I at Vouillé, not far from Poitiers, in 507, and the town thus came under Frankish dominion.

=== Middle Ages ===
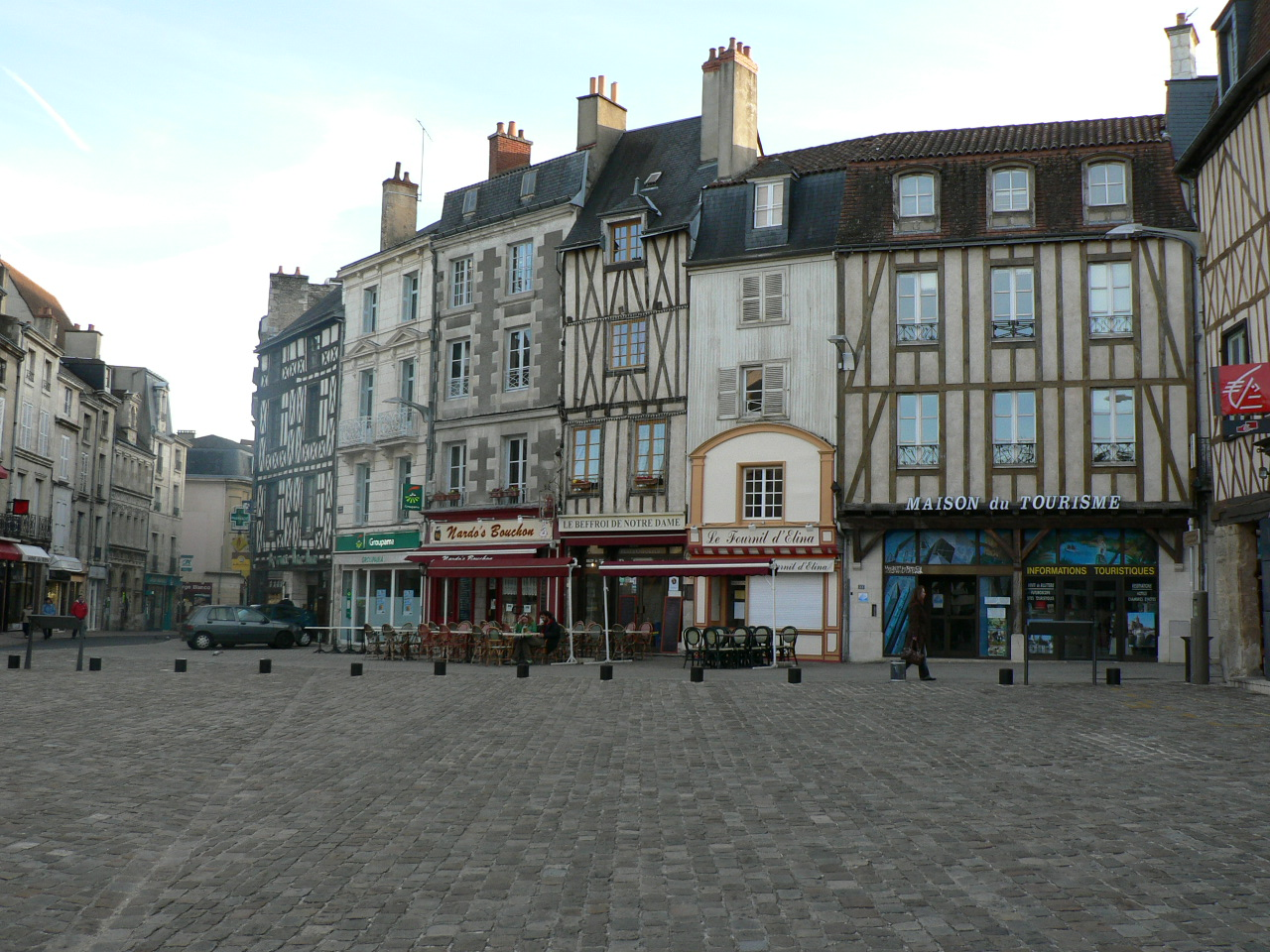
Place Charles-de-Gaulle and its medieval heritage.

During most of the Early Middle Ages, the town of Poitiers took advantage of its defensively favourable location, which was far from the nucleus of the Frankish power. As the seat of a diocese since the 4th century, the town was locally important and the capital of the county of Poitou. At the crux of their power, the Counts of Poitiers governed a sizeable domain, including both Nouvelle-Aquitaine and Poitou.

The town was often referred to as Poictiers, a name commemorated in warships of the Royal Navy, after the Battle of Poitiers.

The first decisive victory of a Western European Christian army over an Islamic power, the Battle of Tours, was fought by Charles Martel's troops in the vicinity of Poitiers on 10 October 732.

Eleanor of Aquitaine frequently resided in the town, which she embellished and fortified, and, in 1199, entrusted with communal rights. In 1152 she married the future King of England Henry II in Poitiers Cathedral.

During the Hundred Years' War, the Battle of Poitiers, an English victory, was fought near the town of Poitiers on 19 September 1356. Later in the war in 1418, under Charles VII, the royal parliament moved from Paris to Poitiers, where it remained in exile until the Plantagenets finally withdrew from the capital in 1436. During this interval, in 1429, Poitiers was the site of Joan of Arc's formal inquest.

The University of Poitiers was founded in 1431. During and after the Reformation, John Calvin had numerous converts in Poitiers and the town had its share of the violent proceedings which underlined the Wars of Religion throughout France.

In 1569, Poitiers was defended against an assailing siege by Guy de Daillon, Count of Lude, against Admiral of France Gaspard de Coligny, who after an unsuccessful bombardment and seven weeks, retired from a siege he had laid to the town.

=== 16th century ===
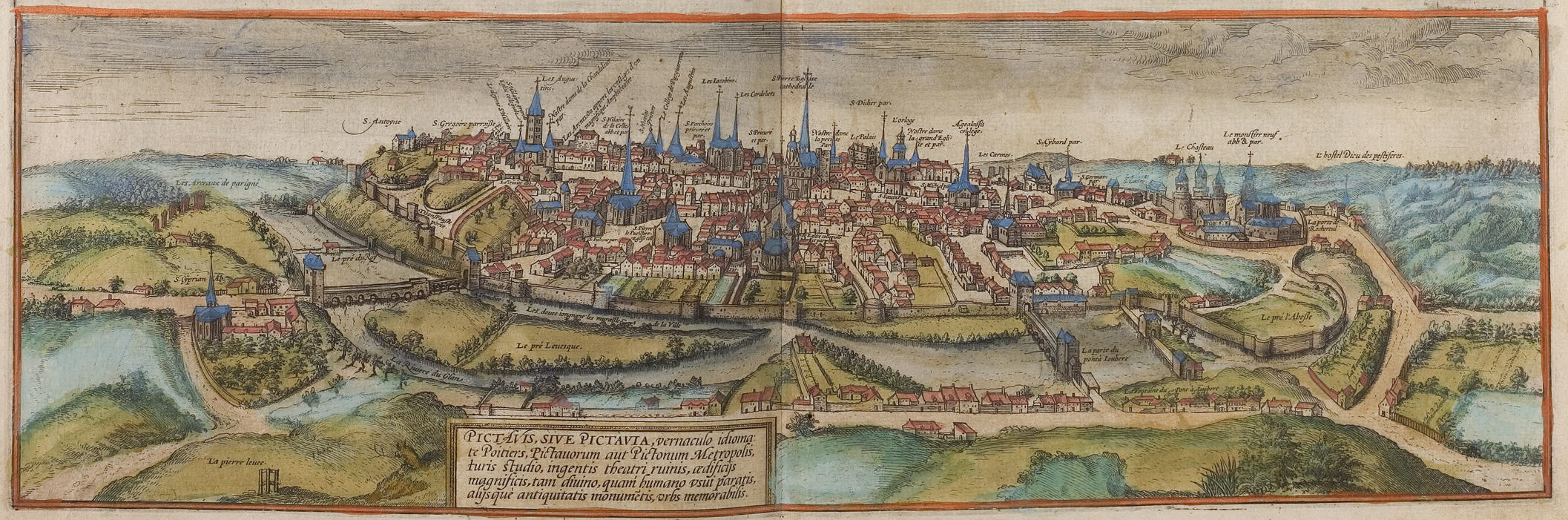
Poitiers in the 16th century.

The type of political organization existing in Poitiers during the late medieval and early modern period can be sheened through a speech given on 14 July 1595 by Maurice Roatin, the town's mayor. He compared it to the Roman state, which combined three types of government: monarchy, aristocracy, and democracy. He said the Roman Consulate corresponded to Poitiers' mayor, the Roman Senate to the town's peers and échevins, and the democratic element in Rome corresponded to the fact that most important matters "can not be decided except by the advice of the Mois et Cent" (the broad council).^{1} The mayor appears to have been an advocate of a mixed constitution; not all Frenchmen in 1595 would have agreed with him, at least in public; many spoke in favor of absolute monarchy which would be pioneered by king Louis XIV. The democratic element was not as strong as the mayor's words may have seemed to imply: in fact, Poitiers was similar to other French cities such as, Paris, Nantes, Marseille, Limoges, La Rochelle, and Dijon, in that the town's governing body (corps de ville) was "highly exclusive and oligarchical:" With a small number of professionals and family groups controlling most of the city offices. In Poitiers many of these positions were granted for the lifetime of the office holder, an archaic byproduct of the Age of Absolutism in France.^{2}

The city government in Poitiers based its claims to legitimacy on the theory of government where the mayor and échevins held jurisdiction of the fief's administration separate from the monarchy: that is, they swore allegiance and promised support for him, and in return he granted them local authority. This gave them the advantage of being able to claim that any townsperson who challenged their preeminence was being treasonous to the king's decree. Annually the mayor and the 24 échevins would swear an oath of allegiance "between the hands" of the king or his representative, usually the lieutenant general or the Sénéchaussée. For example, in 1567, when Maixent Poitevin was mayor, King Henry III came for a visit, and, although some townspeople were disgruntled regarding the licentious behavior of his entourage, Henry smoothed things over with a warm speech acknowledging their allegiance and graciously thanking them for it.^{2}

In this era, the mayor of Poitiers was preceded by sergeants wherever he went, consulted deliberative bodies, carried out their decisions, "heard civil and criminal suits in first instance", tried to ensure that the food supply would be adequate, and visited markets.^{2}

In the 16th century, Poitiers impressed visitors because of its large size, and important features, including "royal courts, universities, prolific printing shops, wealthy religious institutions, cathedrals, numerous parishes, markets, impressive domestic architecture, extensive fortifications, and castle."^{3}16th-century Poitiers is closely associated with the life of François Rabelais and the community of Bitards.

=== 17th century ===
The cosmopolitan town saw less activity during the 17th century. Few changes were made in the urban landscape, except for laying the way for the Rue de la Tranchée. Moreover bridges were built where the inhabitants had used fords. A few Hôtels particuliers were built at that time, such as the Hôtels Jean Baucé, Fumé and Berthelot. Poets Joachim du Bellay and Pierre Ronsard converged at the University of Poitiers, before leaving for Paris.

During the 17th century, many people emigrated from Poitiers and the Poitou to the French settlements in the North America, including many Acadians who would later become Cajuns.

=== 18th century ===
During the 18th century, the town's ebb and flow mainly depended on its administrative functions as the regional capital: Poitiers served as the seat for the regional administration of royal justice, the bishopric, the monasteries, and the intendance of the Généralité du Poitou.

The Viscount of Blossac, intendant of Poitou from 1750 to 1784, had a French garden landscaped in Poitiers. He also had Eleanor of Aquitaine's wall razed, building modern boulevards in its place.

=== 19th century ===
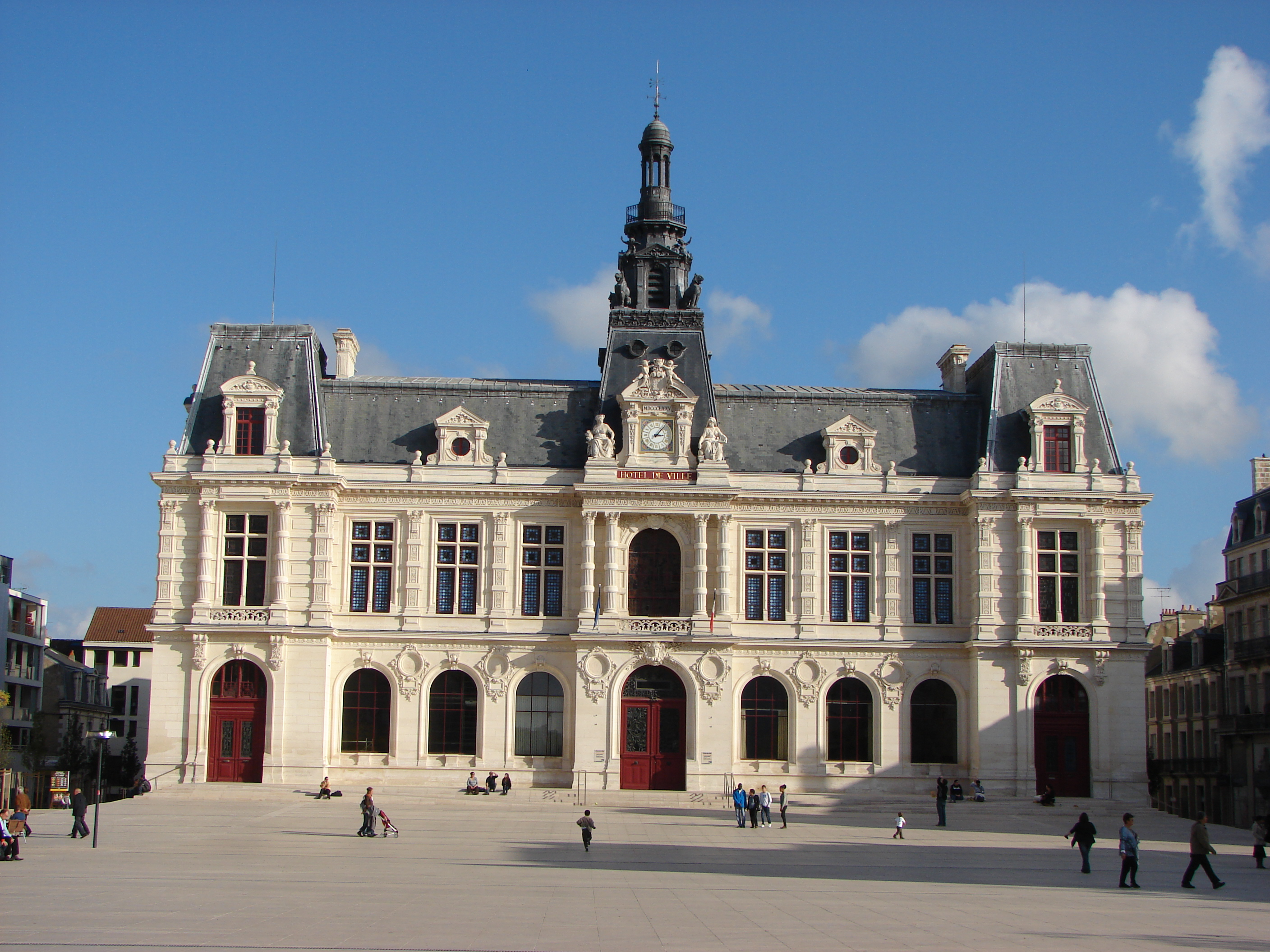
The Hôtel de Ville.

During the 19th century, many army bases were built in Poitiers because of its strategic location. Poitiers would also become a garrison town, despite its distance from France's borders.

The Poitiers train station was built in the 1850s, and connected Poitiers to the rest of France. The Hôtel de Ville (city hall) on Place du Maréchal-Leclerc was completed in 1875.

=== 20th century and contemporary Poitiers ===
Poitiers was bombed during World War II, particularly the area around the railway station which was heavily hit on 13 June 1944.

From the late 1950s until the late 1960s when Charles de Gaulle ended the American military presence, the U.S. Army and U.S. Air Force had an array of military installations in France, including a major Army logistics and communications hub in Poitiers, part of what was called the Communication Zone (ComZ), and consisting of a logistics headquarters and communications agency located at Aboville Caserne, a military compound situated on a hill above the city. Hundreds of graduates ("Military Brats") of Poitiers American High School, a school operated by the Department of Defense School System (DODDS), have gone on to maintain successful careers, including the recent commander-in-chief of the U.S. Special Forces Command, Army General Bryan (Doug) Brown. The Caserne also housed a full support community, with a theater, commissary, recreation facilities and an affiliate radio station of the American Forces Network, Europe, headquartered in Frankfurt (now Mannheim, Germany.)

The town benefited from the industrial Décentralisation of France in the 1970s, for instance with the installation during that decade of the Michelin and Compagnie des compteurs Schlumberger factories. The Futuroscope theme-park and research park project, built in 1986–1987 in nearby Chasseneuil-du-Poitou, after an idea by French politician René Monory, consolidated Poitiers' place as a touristic destination and as a modern university center, opening the town to the era of information technology.

== Main sights ==
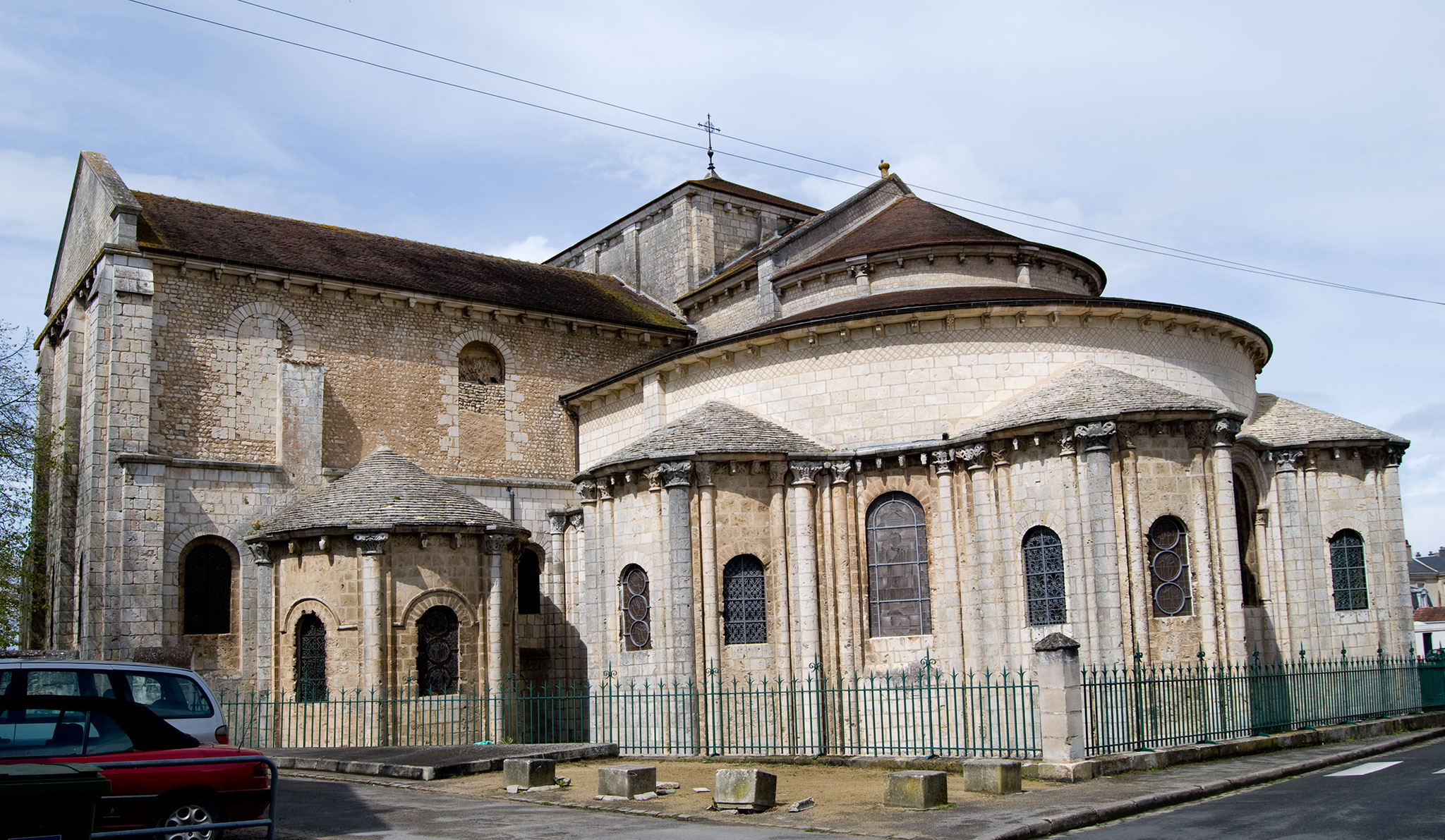
Church of St. Hilary le Grand.

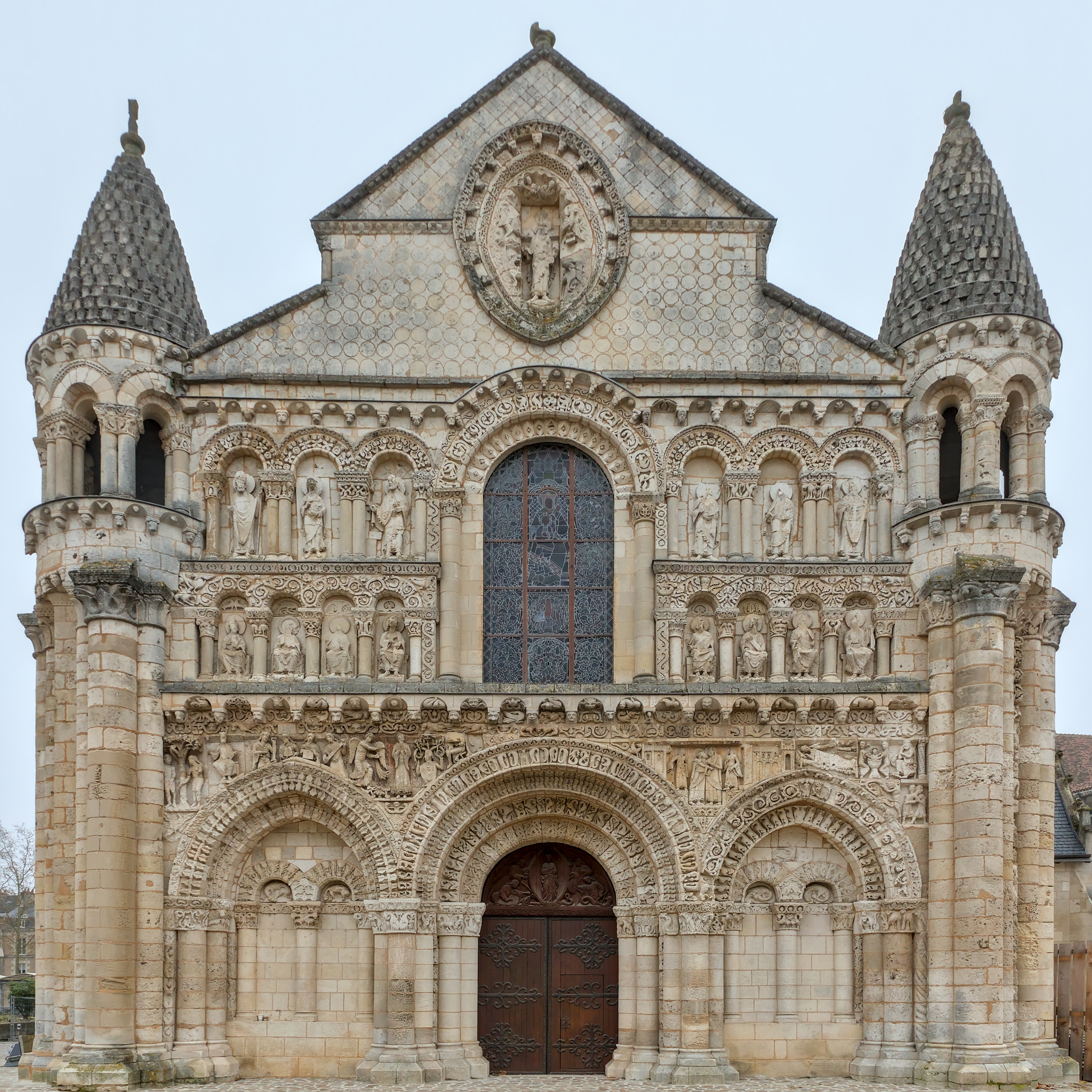
Church of Notre-Dame la Grande.

Historic churches, in particular Romanesque buildings, are the main attraction inside Poitiers itself. The town center has maintained much of the pre-modern architecture, and is home to a re-zoned pedestrian area.

Tourism grew after the creation of the Futuroscope theme-park and the research park in nearby Chasseneuil-du-Poitou, especially from the United Kingdom. It has also benefited from the TGV high-speed rail link to Paris.

- Baptistère Saint-Jean (4th century), the oldest church in France
- Palace of Poitiers, the seat of the dukes of Aquitaine
- Church of Notre-Dame la Grande, oldest Romanesque church in Europe
- Poitiers Cathedral (Cathédrale Saint-Pierre), (12th century)
- Musée Sainte-Croix, the largest museum in Poitiers
- Church of St. Radegonde (6th century)
- Church of Saint-Hilaire le Grand (11th century)
- Hypogée des Dunes (underground chapel)
- Jardin des Plantes de Poitiers, a park and botanical garden
- Church of Saint-Jean de Montierneuf
- Théâtre Municipal de Poitiers, by the French architect Édouard Lardillier
- Parc du Futuroscope (European Park of the Moving Image, some 10 km (6.2 mi) north of Poitiers; theme is visual communication technology in ultramodern buildings)

== Sports ==
The Stade Poitevin, founded in 1900, is a multi-sports club, which fields several top-level teams in a variety of sports. These include a volleyball team that play in the French Pro A volleyball league, a basketball team, an amateur football team and a professional rugby team (as of the 2008–2009 season).

The PB86 or Poitiers Basket 86 play in the French Pro A basketball league. In the 2009–10 season, three Americans played for PB86: Rasheed Wright, Kenny Younger and Tommy Gunn. The team played the French championship playoffs in the 2009–10 season and was the Pro B French Champion for the 2008–2009 season. The team's communication strategy is considered by some to be one of the best in the French basketball scene.

Brian Joubert, the French figure skating champion, practices at Poitiers' Ice Rink and lives with his family in the city.

== Transport ==
Poitiers' railway station lies on the TGV Atlantique line between Paris and Bordeaux. The station is in the valley to the west of the old town center. Services run to Angoulême, Limoges and La Rochelle in addition to Paris and Bordeaux. The direct TGV puts Poitiers 1 hour and 40 minutes from the Parisian Gare Montparnasse.

Poitiers–Biard Airport is located 2.4 kilometres (1.5 mi) west of Poitiers with flights to Lyon-Saint Exupéry, London Stansted, Edinburgh and Shannon, Ireland on Ryanair.

Urban transportation in Poitiers is provided by a company dubbed Vitalis although their e-infrastructure is difficult to access. Regional ground transportation in the department of the Vienne is provided by private bus companies such as "Ligne en Vienne." Rail transportation in the region is provided by the public TER Nouvelle-Aquitaine (regional express train).

Between January 2009 and December 2012, Poitiers' town center underwent significant transformations aimed at reducing motor vehicle access. The initiative, called "Projet Cœur d'Agglo," sought to rethink the role of individual car use for accessing the town center and daily transportation. On 29 September 2010, 12 streets were permanently closed to motor vehicles, creating a fully pedestrianized zone. Lastly, a new line of fast buses was added around 2017.

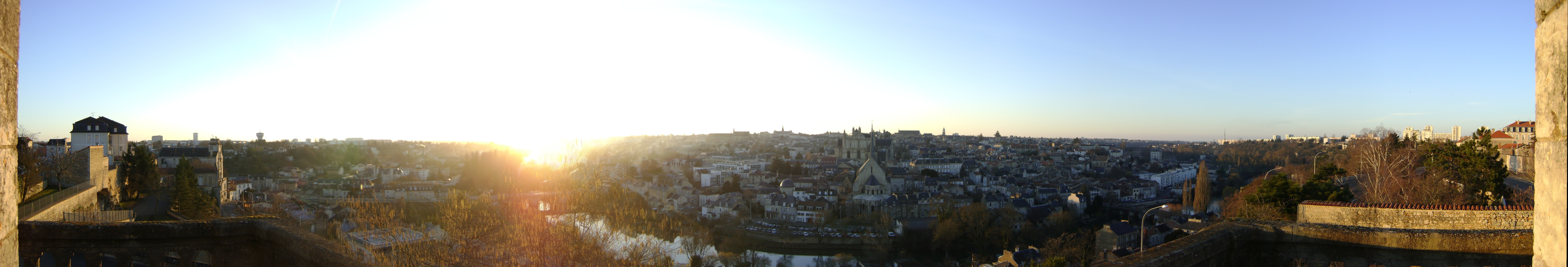
Panoramic view of Poitiers at sunset.

== Education ==
Poitiers has functioned as a university centre since the late Middle Ages. The University of Poitiers was established in 1431 and has educated or employed prominent scholars and thinkers, including François Rabelais, René Descartes, Francis Bacon and Samir Amin.

Today Poitiers has more students per inhabitant than any other large town or city in France. All around, there are over 27,000 university students in Poitiers, nearly 4,000 of which are foreigners, hailing from 117 countries. The University covers all major fields from sciences to geography, history, languages economics and law.

The law degree at the University of Poitiers is considered to be one of the best in France. The program was ranked second by L'Étudiant magazine in 2005.

In addition to the University, Poitiers also hosts two engineering schools and two business schools:

- the École nationale supérieure de mécanique et d'aérotechnique (ENSMA)
- the École nationale supérieure d'ingénieurs de Poitiers (ENSIP)
- the France Business School (FBS)
- the Institut d'Administration des Entreprises de Poitiers (IAE).

Since 2001, the city of Poitiers has hosted the first cycle of "The South America, Spain and Portugal" program from the Paris Institute of Political Studies, also known as Sciences Po.

== International relations ==
Poitiers is twinned with:

- Northampton, United Kingdom
- Marburg, Germany
- Lafayette, United States
- Coimbra, Portugal
- Yaroslavl, Russia
- Iași, Romania
- Moundou, Chad

== People ==
This is a list of people of interest who were born or resided in Poitiers:

- Oklou (born 1993), musician, singer, music producer, DJ, composer and actress
- Carpenter Brut (born 1977), DJ, producer and composer
- Hilary of Poitiers (c300–367), elected bishop of Poitiers around the year 350, exiled and returned to die there
- Saint Radegonde or Radegund (c. 520 to 587), Thuringian princess and queen of France, founded an abbey in Poitiers and performed miracles there
- Charles Martel, French general who defeated the Muslim Umayyad army in the Battle of Tours in 732
- Eleanor of Aquitaine, queen consort of France (1137-1152) and England (1152-1204), was born, periodically lived, and died in Poitiers.
- François Rabelais, Renaissance writer and humanist
- Pope Clement V
- St. Venantius Fortunatus, 6th-century Latin poet and hymnodist and Bishop in the Roman Catholic Church
- Marie Louise Trichet (1684–1759)
- William Longchamp, buried at the abbey of Le Pin, 1197
- René Descartes studied law at the University of Poitiers
- Saint Louis de Montfort
- Michel Aco (1680–1702), explorer, was born in Poitiers
- Ribar Baikoua (born 1991), basketball player
- Camille Berthomier (born 1984), singer in English rock band Savages, actress
- Antoine Brizard, born in Poitiers in 1994, member of the France men's national volleyball team.
- Maxime Bouttier (born 1993), actor, model
- Susann Cokal, novelist, lived in Poitiers in mid-1980s and based her first novel Mirabilis on the geography of the city
- Lionel Charbonnier (born 1966), footballer (goalkeeper), World Cup winner for France. Played most notably for AJ Auxerre and Rangers.
- Romain Édouard (born 1990), chess player and grandmaster
- Éric Élisor (born 1971), former professional footballer
- Maryse Éwanjé-Épée (born 1964), athlete
- Monique Éwanjé-Épée (born 1967), athlete
- Fernand Fau, born in Poitiers in 1858, illustrator and cartoonist
- Michel Foucault (1926–1984), philosopher
- Marie-France Garaud, born in Poitiers in 1934, politician
- Hélène Grémillon, (born 1977), writer, winner of the 2011 Prix Emmanuel Roblès
- Camille Guérin, born in Poitiers in 1872, discovered a vaccine against tuberculosis with Albert Calmette in 1924
- Bruce Inkango (born 1984), footballer
- Yassine Jebbour (born 1991), footballer
- Brian Joubert (born 1984), ice skating champion
- Natan Jurkovitz (born 1995), French-Swiss-Israeli basketball player for Hapoel Be'er Sheva of the Israeli Basketball Premier League
- Hervé Lhommedet (born 1973), footballer
- Frédéric Mémin (born 1979), footballer
- Blanche Monnier (1849–1913), socialite, known for being falsely imprisoned by her mother for 25 years
- Mahyar Monshipour (born 1975), World Boxing Association super bantamweight champion from 2003 to 2006
- Francis N'Ganga (born 1985), footballer
- Elsa N'Guessan (born 1984), swimmer
- Simon Pagenaud, race car driver
- Jean-Pierre Raffarin (born 1948), politician and senator for Vienne, former prime minister of France (2002–2005)
- Joël Robuchon, born in Poitiers in 1945, French chef and restaurateur
- Paul Rougnon (1846–1934), composer and professor at the Conservatoire de Paris
- Jean-Pierre Thiollet, born in Poitiers in 1956, French author
- Louis Vierne (1870–1937), organist & composer, eventually at the Notre Dame cathedral, Paris
- Romain Vincelot (born 1985), footballer

== See also ==
- Communes of the Vienne department
- Pierre-Marie Poisson
- The works of Maxime Real del Sarte
