= Venantius Fortunatus =

Italian saint-bishop, poet and hymnwriter (c. 530-c. 600/609)

Saint Venantius Fortunatus
- Fortunatus, from a manuscript of his Vita Radegundis

Church Father, Bishop of Poitiers
- Born: c. 530; Venetia, Kingdom of the Ostrogoths
- Died: c. 600 or 609; Pictavium, Kingdom of the Franks
- Venerated in: Roman Catholic Church; Eastern Orthodox Church
- Feast: 14 December

Venantius Honorius Clementianus Fortunatus (c. 530 – c. 600/609 AD; French: Venance Fortunat), known as Saint Venantius Fortunatus (/vəˈnænʃəs ˌfɔːrtjəˈneɪtəs/, Latin: [weːˈnantɪ.ʊs fɔrtuːˈnaːtʊs]), was a Latin poet and hymnographer in the Merovingian Court, and a Christian bishop who has been venerated since the Middle Ages.

== Life ==
Venantius Fortunatus was born between 530 and 540 at Duplavis (or Duplavilis), near Treviso in Veneto, Italy. He grew up during the Roman reconquest of Italy, but there is controversy as to where he spent his childhood. Some historians, such as D. Tardi, suggest that Fortunatus' family moved to Aquileia because of the turbulent political situation in Treviso after the death of King Theoderic. This theory is suggested because there is evidence of Fortunatus speaking warmly about one of the bishops there, Bishop Paul of Aquileia. Other scholars, such as Judith George, suggest that his family never moved to Aquileia, pointing out that the poet speaks more of Duplavis than any other place regarding his childhood. Sometime in the 550s or 60s, he travelled to Ravenna to study. While there, he was given a classical education, in the Roman manner. His later work shows familiarity with not only classical Latin poets such as Virgil, Horace, Ovid, Statius, and Martial, but also with Christian poets, including Arator, Claudian, and Coelius Sedulius, and shows signs of their influence. In addition, it is probable that Fortunatus had some knowledge of the Greek language and classical Greek writers and philosophers, as throughout his poetry and prose he makes reference at times to these latter and to Greek terms.

Fortunatus eventually moved to Metz in the spring of 566, probably with the specific intention of becoming a poet at the Merovingian Court. It was there that his successful career really began. To reach Metz, he took a winding route, passing through four modern countries: Italy, Austria, Germany and France. Fortunatus himself explains two entirely different reasons for this route. For one, he "portrays himself in the guise of a wandering minstrel, his journey just one in a series of adventures." The second reason he offers is more religious, and we see him explaining in his Vita S. Martini that he took this route to venerate St Martin at his shrine in Tours, visiting other shrines as he went.

Fortunatus' arrival in Metz coincided with the marriage of King Sigibert and Queen Brunhild, and at the ceremony, he performed a celebration poem for the entire court. After this incident, Fortunatus had many noble patrons, as well as bishops, who wished him to write poetry for them. About a year after he arrived in Metz, Fortunatus travelled to the court of King Charibert, Sigibert's brother, in Paris, and stayed there until Charibert's death in 567 or 568. Due to the danger represented by King Chilperic, brother to Sigibert and Charibert, Fortunatus had to travel south to Tours, returning to Sigibert's lands. From there, he ventured to Poitiers where he met Radegund. They became close friends, and Fortunatus wrote many poems in her honour and in support of her political campaigns. Fortunatus had made another great friendship in Tours and Poitiers. This was with Gregory of Tours, who was installed as Bishop of Tours in 573, and from whom Fortunatus received patronage. In 580, Fortunatus wrote a poem defending Gregory against charges of treason made against him at Chilperic's court. Following the deaths of both Sigibert and Chilperic, Fortunatus moved to the court which Childebert, who was Sigibert's son, had established at Poitiers. Around the year 576, Fortunatus received ordination. He stayed in Poitiers until around the year 599-600, when he was appointed Bishop of Poitiers, in succession to Bishop Plato. He was to die in the early years of the 7th century. Though it would appear that nothing resembling a modern canonization ever took place, after his death he acquired the title of saint. Moreover, the latest official edition of the Roman Martyrology commemorates Venantius Fortunatus as a saint under the date of 14 December.

== Works ==
Fortunatus is best known for two poems that have become part of the liturgy of the Catholic Church, the Pange lingua gloriosi proelium certaminis ("Sing, O tongue, of the glorious struggle"), a hymn that later inspired St Thomas Aquinas's Pange Lingua Gloriosi Corporis Mysterium. He also wrote Vexilla Regis prodeunt ("The royal banners forward go"), which is sung at Vespers during Holy Week. This poem was written in honour of a substantial relic of the True Cross, which had been sent by the Byzantine Emperor Justin II to Queen Radegund of the Franks. After the death of her husband Chlotar I, she had founded a monastery in Poitiers to which she herself retired. The Municipal Library in Poitiers houses an 11th-century manuscript on the life of Radegund, copied from a 6th-century account by Fortunatus. The theme of the hymn Vexilla Regis prodeunt led to its later use also in connection with the feast of the Exaltation of the Holy Cross.

Venantius Fortunatus wrote eleven surviving books of Latin poetry in a variety of genres, including epitaphs, panegyrics, georgics, works of consolation, and religious poems. A major genre of Fortunatus' poetry is the panegyric. Of these, he wrote four major works in honour of four Merovingian Kings: Sigibert and Brunhild, Charibert, Chilperic and Childebert II and Brunhild. The first of these marked his debut at the Merovingian court at Metz, and was meant to honour the marriage of Sigibert and Brunhild. It is a fanciful poem, telling the story of how the bride and groom were brought together by Cupid, recalling the style of the classical Latin poets. The second, for Charibert, celebrates his rule, and gives the impression that this Frankish king was the descendant and successor in an unbroken line of the Roman kings, hence lending support to the legitimacy of the new king's rule. The third, in honour of King Chilperic, is not without controversial aspects. Though Chilperic was known as a headstrong and hot-tempered ruler, Fortunatus depicts him as gracious, compassionate and merciful, a man who never makes hasty judgments. The king is even praised for his king's poetry. This poem coincided with the trial for treason of Gregory of Tours, Fortunatus' patron and friend. Some scholars have suggested that Fortunatus is simply trying to appease a new patron (Chilperic) and assist Gregory in his dangerous plight. However, other scholars, such as Brennan and George, disagree, postulating that Fortunatus' intention was to offer a gentle hint to Chilperic, by means of the moralistic tone adopted, as to how an ideal king would rule. Thus, the poem becomes in effect a plea for his friend Gregory of Tours, while avoiding any brush with the king.

Fortunatus wrote panegyrics and other types of poems, including praise, eulogies, personal poems to bishops and friends alike, consolations and poems in support of political issues, particularly those presented by his friends Gregory of Tours and Radegunde. His eleven books of poetry contain his surviving poems, all ordered chronologically and by importance of subject. For instance, a poem about God naturally comes before the panegyric for a king, which in turn will come before a eulogy for a bishop. This collection of poems is the main primary source for any deductions about Fortunatus' life.

His verse is important in the development of later Latin literature, largely because he wrote at a time when Latin prosody was moving away from the quantitative verse of classical Latin and towards the accentual meters of medieval Latin. His style sometimes suggests the influence of Hiberno-Latin, in learned Greek coinages that occasionally appear in his poems.

Fortunatus' other major work was Vita S. Martini It is a long narrative poem, reminiscent of the classical epics of Greek and Roman cultures but replete with Christian references and allusions, depicting the life of Saint Martin. He also wrote a verse hagiography of his patron Queen Radegund (continued by the nun Baudonivia).

His hymns are used extensively in the Hymnal 1982 of the Episcopal Church. One of his hymns was set to music by the modern composer Randall Giles. Another hymn, as translated from the Latin (Welcome, happy morning! age to age shall say), celebrates Easter with music by Sir Arthur Sullivan.

== Impact and contributions ==
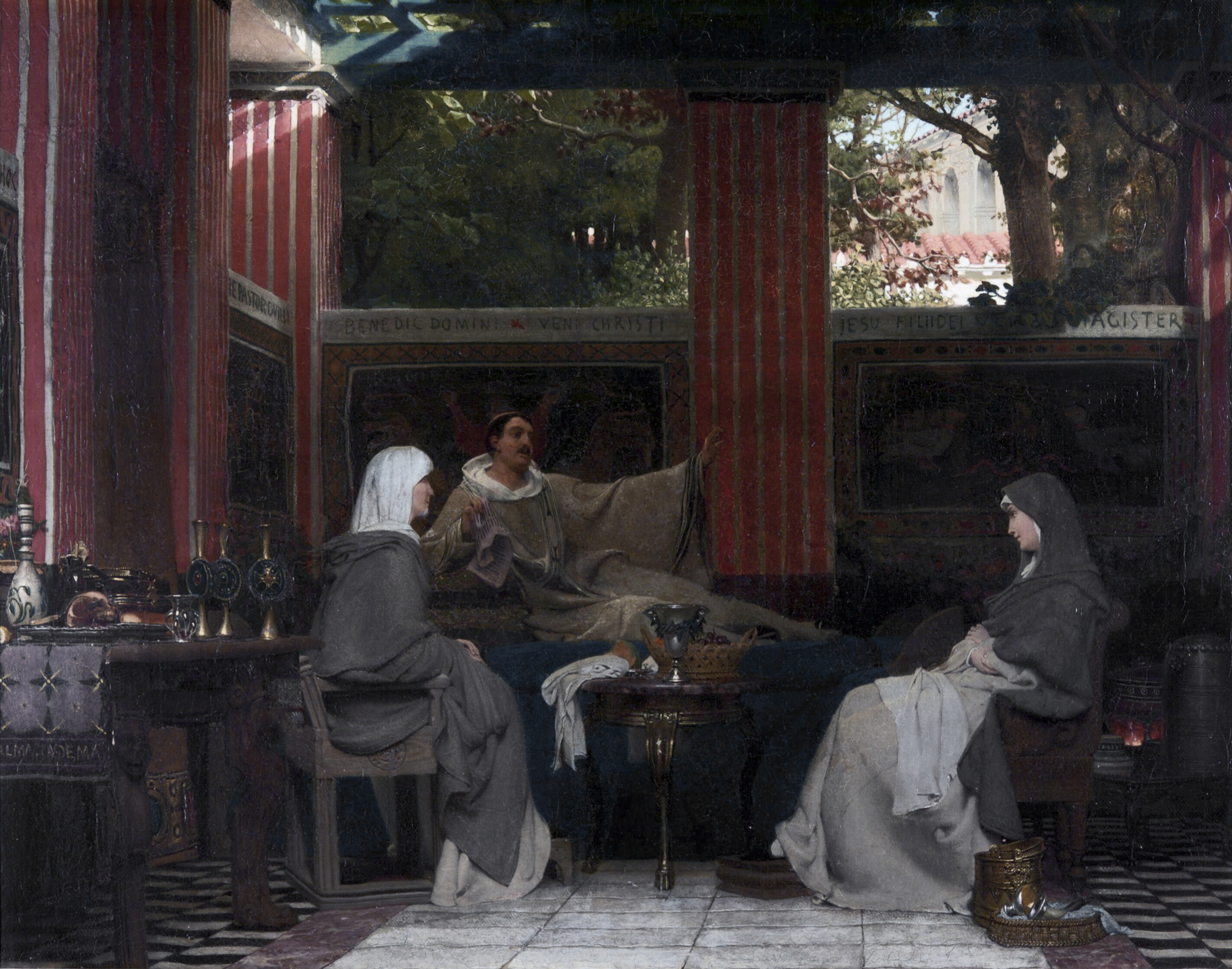
Venantius Fortunatus Reading His Poems to Radegonda VI by Lawrence Alma-Tadema (1862)

In his time, Fortunatus filled a great social desire for Latin poetry. He was one of the most prominent poets at this point, and had many contracts, commissions and correspondences with kings, bishops and noblemen and women from the time he arrived in Gaul until his death. He used his poetry to advance in society, to promote political ideas he supported, usually conceived of by Radegunde or by Gregory, and to pass on personal thoughts and communications. He was a master wordsmith, and because of his promotion of the church, as well as the Roman tendencies of the Frankish royalty, he remained in favour with most of his acquaintances throughout his lifetime.

From the point of view of the present day, Fortunatus provides another window into the world of the Merovingian court. For much of this period, the only reliable source on the subject is Gregory of Tours' history, but as it is well known that Gregory had his own political and personal agendas, the objectivity of his accounts can sometimes come into question. While Fortunatus tends to embellish or even mock the happenings and truth of the situations he writes about, there is an element of inferred truth, whether it is his classical embellishments on the marriage panegyric for Sigibert, or his recalling the traits of the ideal ruler to correct a bad king. With this, he supplies an alternate view of everything going on at court, a view which at times differs from Gregory's account.

His works have been set to music in settings which themselves have become prominent artworks. Anton Bruckner composed a motet based on Vexilla Regis, and Knut Nystedt a choral setting of O Crux Splendidior.
