= Gallicum (disambiguation) =

Gallicum is the Latin term to refer to someone or something from Gaul or France.

Gallicum may also refer to:

== Places ==
- English Channel, the strait between the island of Great Britain and continental Europe, sometimes referred to as Fretum Gallicum
- Gallicum or Gallikon, a city in ancient Macedonia
- Strait of Bonifacio, the strait between the islands of Corsica and Sardinia in the Mediterranean, sometimes referred to as Fretum Gallicum

== Education ==
- Pontifical French Seminary, a college that trained French-speaking Roman Catholic priests, sometimes referred to as Pontificium Seminarium Gallicum
- University of Freiburg from 1679–1714 named Studium Gallicum, a university in Germany

== Art and literature ==
- Commentarii de Bello Gallico, a.k.a. Bellum Gallicum, 58–49 BC account of the Gallic Wars by Julius Caesar
- Libellus ad evitandum et expellendum morbum Gallicum, a medical text by Juan Almenar
- Quintuplex Psalterium: Gallicum, Romanum, Hebraicum, Vetus, Conciliatum, a 1509 study of religious texts by Jacques Lefèvre d'Étaples

== Taxonomy ==
- Acerentomon gallicum, a species of proturan in the family Acerentomidae
- Bittium gallicum, a species of sea snails in the family Cerithiidae
- Brachychirotherium gallicum, a species of chirothere in the ichnogenus Brachychirotherium
- Cochliopodium gallicum, a species of amoeba in the order Himatismenida
- Corispermum gallicum, a species of erect annual plants in the family Amaranthaceae
- Episyron gallicum, a spider-eating wasp in the family Pompilidae
- Erucastrum gallicum, a.k.a. hairy rocket or common dogmustard, an annual or biennial plant in the family Brassicaceae
- Eurheloderma gallicum, an extinct species of heloderm lizard in the family Helodermatidae
- Laserpitium gallicum, a species of flowering plants in the family Apiaceae
- Phyteuma gallicum, a species of flowering plants in the family Campunulaceae
- Rhizobium gallicum, a Gram-negative root-nodule bacterium in the family Rhizobiaceae
- Zodarion gallicum, a species of ant-eating spiders in the family Zodariidae

== Other ==
- Tau gallicum, or D with short stroke overlay, Ꟈ, ꟈ, a letter that was used in the Gaulish language
- Opus gallicum ("gallic work"), a construction technique

== See also ==
- Gallium (disambiguation)
- Gallica (disambiguation)
- Galician
