= Almenar (surname) =

Almenar is a Spanish surname. Notable people with the surname include:

- Francisco Almenar (1876–1936), Spanish architect and sports leader
- Juan Almenar, Spanish 15th-century physician and author of one of the first books on syphilis
- María Fernández Almenar, Spanish retired footballer
