= Merovingian art and architecture =

Art of the Franks under the Merovingian dynasty

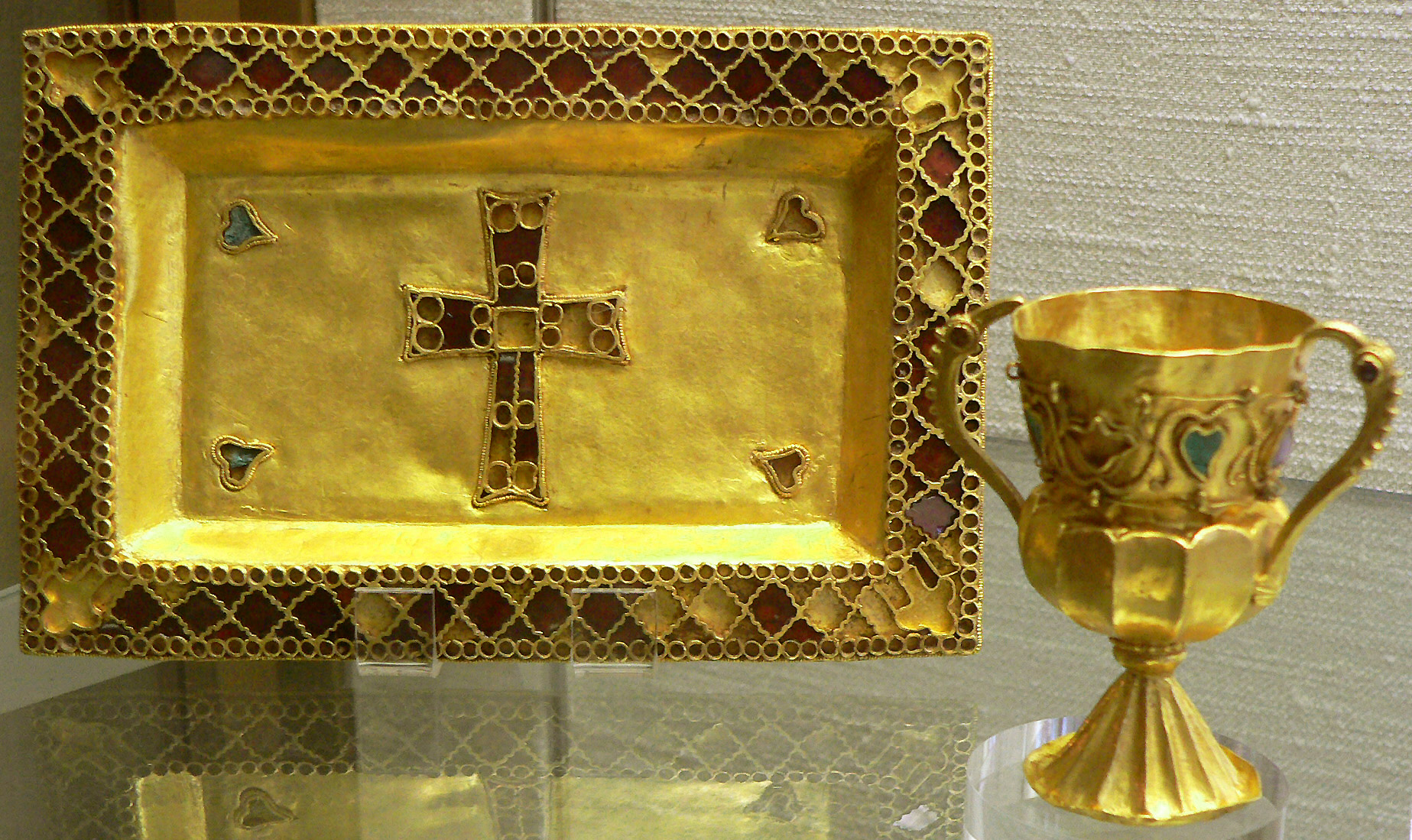
A gold two-handled cup and a rectangular altar plate decorated with an inlaid cross (Treasure of Gordon)

Merovingian art is the art of the Merovingian dynasty of the Franks, which lasted from the 5th century to the 8th century in present-day France, Benelux and a part of Germany. The advent of the Merovingian dynasty in Gaul in the 5th century led to important changes largely in Western European art as it progressed into Carolingian and Romanesque stages. Sculptural arts consisted of the ornamentation of sarcophagi, altars and ecclesiastical furniture. Gold work and the new medium of manuscript illumination integrated "barbarian" animal-style decoration, with Late Antique motifs, and other contributions from as far as Syria or Ireland to constitute Merovingian art.

== Architecture ==
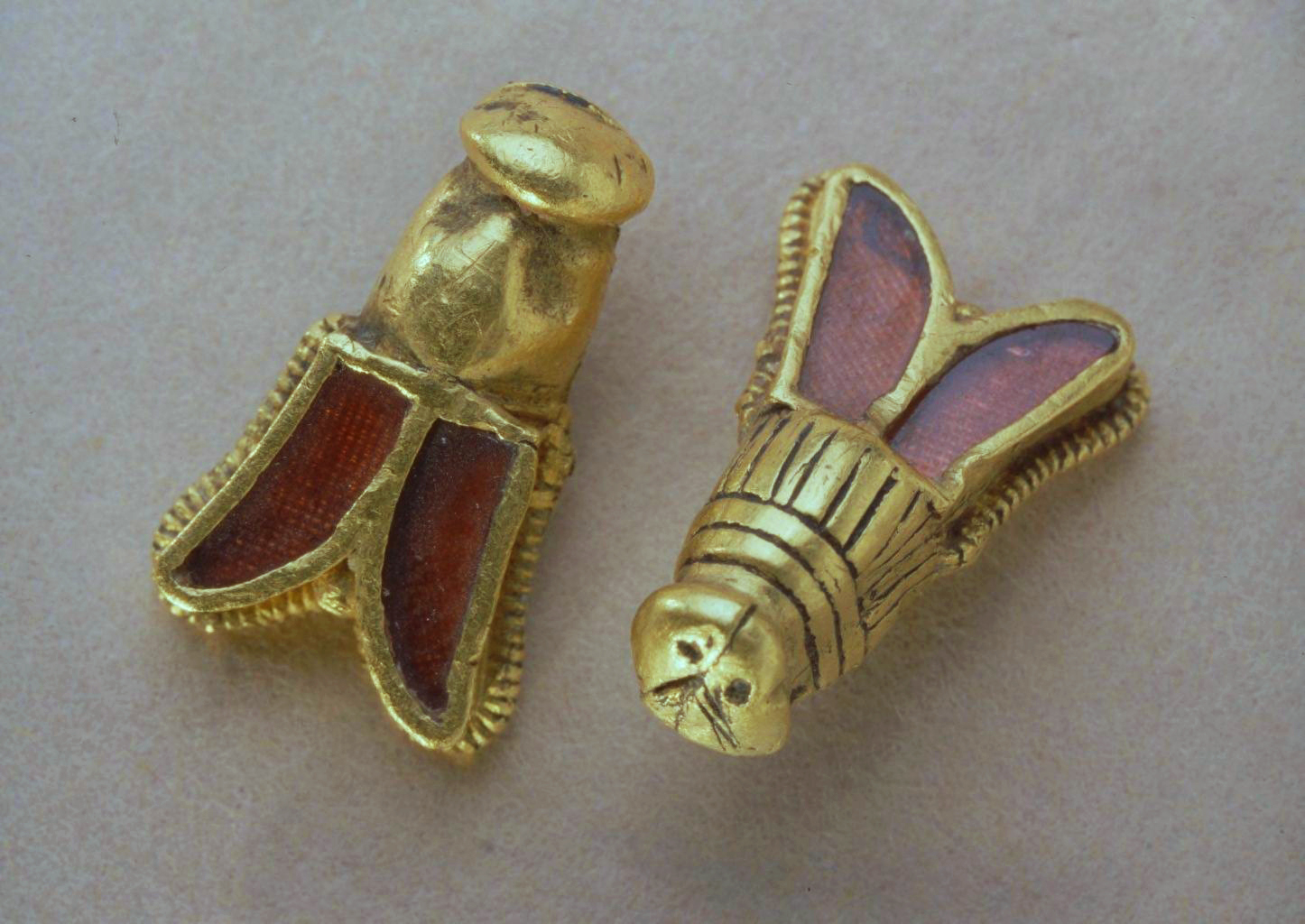
Two gold ornaments with garnet wings from the tomb of King Childeric I at Tournai

The unification of the Frankish kingdom under Clovis I (465–511) and his successors, corresponded with the need for the building of churches, especially monastery churches, as these were now the power-houses of the Merovingian church. Plans often continued the Roman basilica tradition, but also took influences from as far away as Syria and Armenia. In the East, most structures were in timber, but stone was more common for significant buildings in the West and in the southern areas that later fell under Merovingian rule. Most major churches have been rebuilt, usually more than once, but many Merovingian plans have been reconstructed from archaeology.

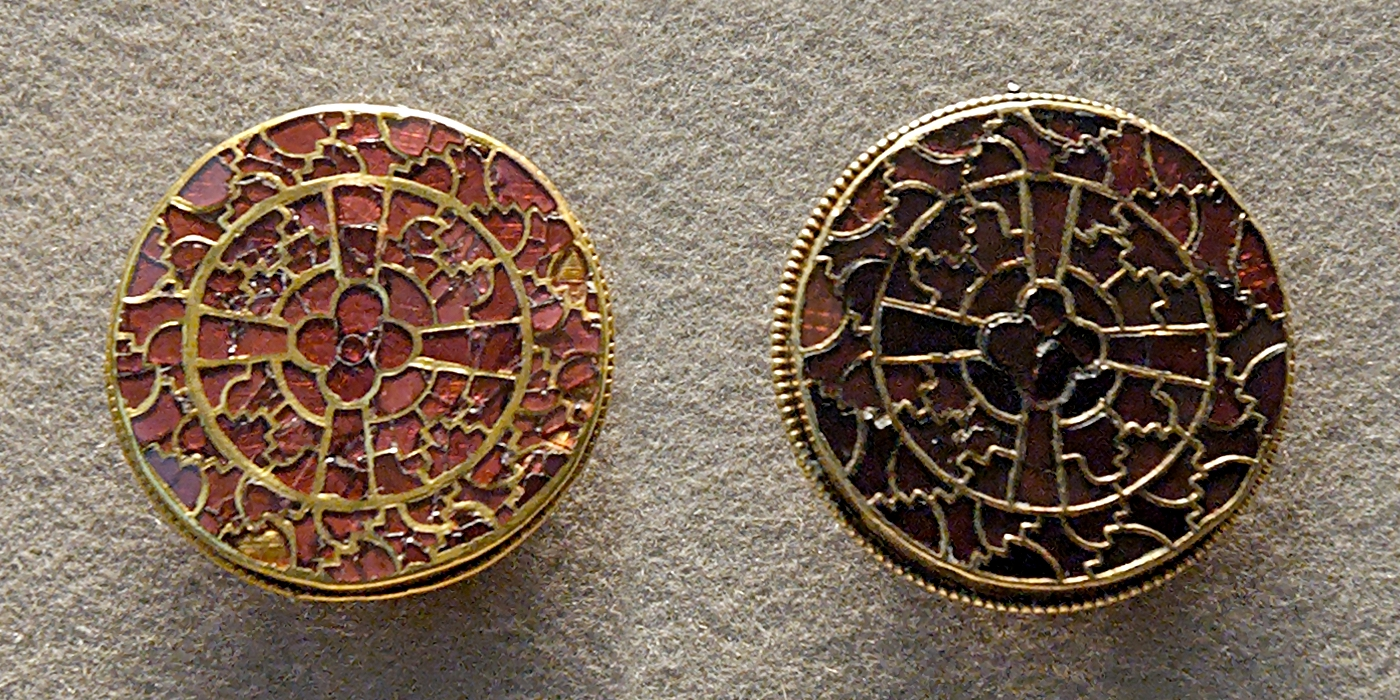
Two circular brooches with intricate gold and garnet inlay from the queen’s tomb at Saint-Denis

The description in Bishop Gregory of Tours' History of the Franks of the basilica of Saint-Martin, built at Tours by Saint Perpetuus (bishop 460–490) at the beginning of the period and at the time on the edge of Frankish territory, gives cause to regret the disappearance of this building, one of the most beautiful Merovingian churches, which he says had 120 marble columns, towers at the East end, and several mosaics: "Saint-Martin displayed the vertical emphasis, and the combination of block-units forming a complex internal space and the correspondingly rich external silhouette, which were to be the hallmarks of the Romanesque". A feature of the basilica of Saint-Martin that became a hallmark of Frankish church architecture was the sarcophagus or reliquary of the saint raised to be visible and sited axially behind the altar, sometimes in the apse. There are no Roman precedents for this Frankish innovation. The Saint Peter's church in Vienne is the only surviving one. A number of other buildings, now lost, including the Merovingian foundations of Saint-Denis, St. Gereon in Cologne, and the Abbey of Saint-Germain-des-Prés in Paris, are described as similarly ornate.

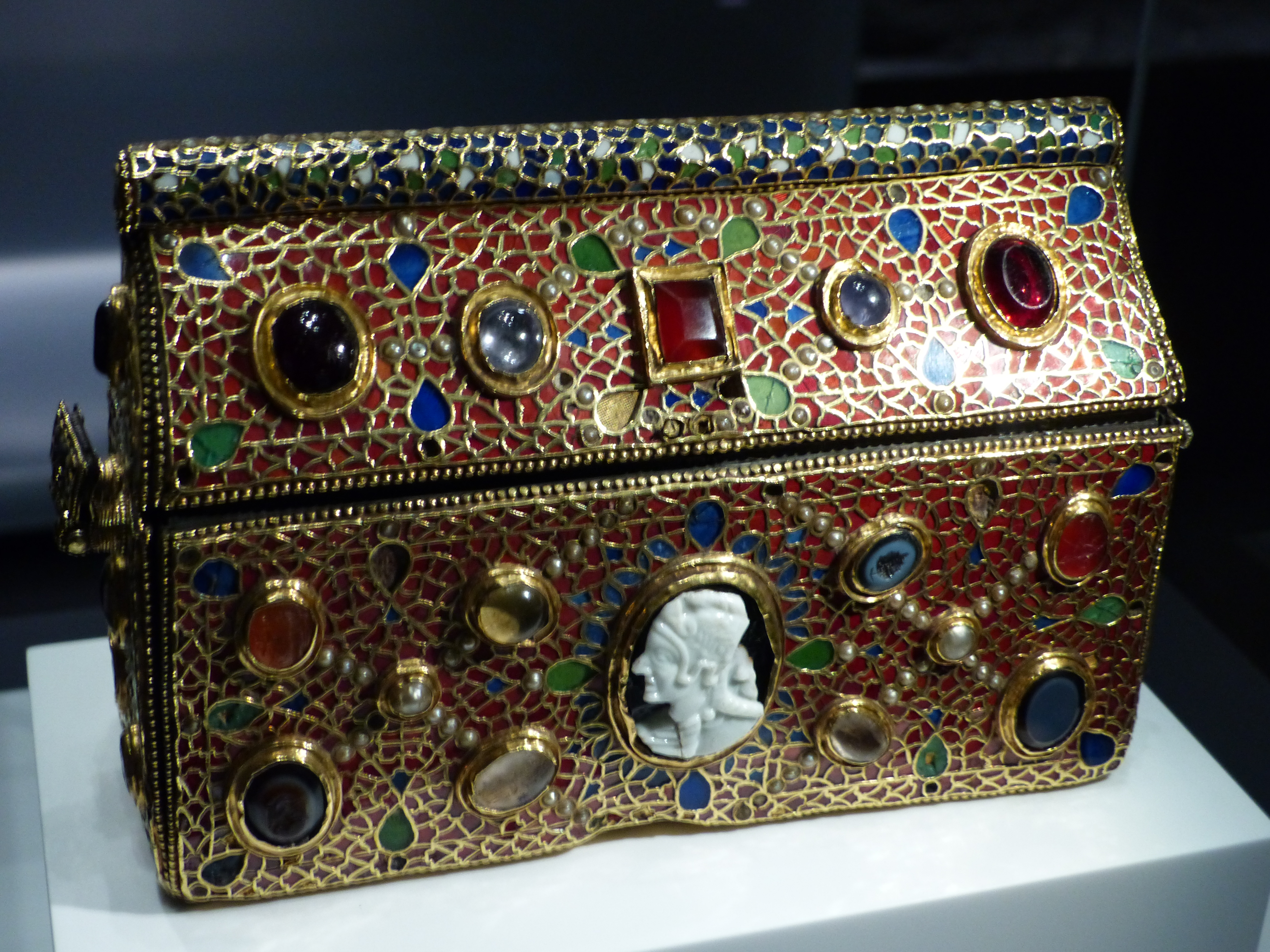
A small, house-shaped shrine decorated with garnets, colored gemstones, and a carved cameo

Some small buildings remain, especially baptisteries, which fell out of fashion and were spared rebuilding. In Aix-en-Provence, Riez and Fréjus, three octagonal baptistries, each covered with a cupola on pillars, are testimony to the influence of oriental architecture (the baptistry of Riez, in the Alpes-de-Haute-Provence, recalls that of St. George, Ezra', Syria). Very different from these Provençal baptistries, except for the quatrefoil one of Venasque, that of St. Jean at Poitiers (6th century) has the form of a rectangle flanked by three apses. The original building has probably undergone a number of alterations but preserves in its decoration (marble capitals) a Merovingian character.

Among the very many crypts, numerous due to the importance of the cult of saints at the time, only those of St. Seurin, Bordeaux, St. Laurent, Grenoble, the crypt of the Abbey of Saint Médard in Soissons, and the abbey of Jouarre (7th century) survive.

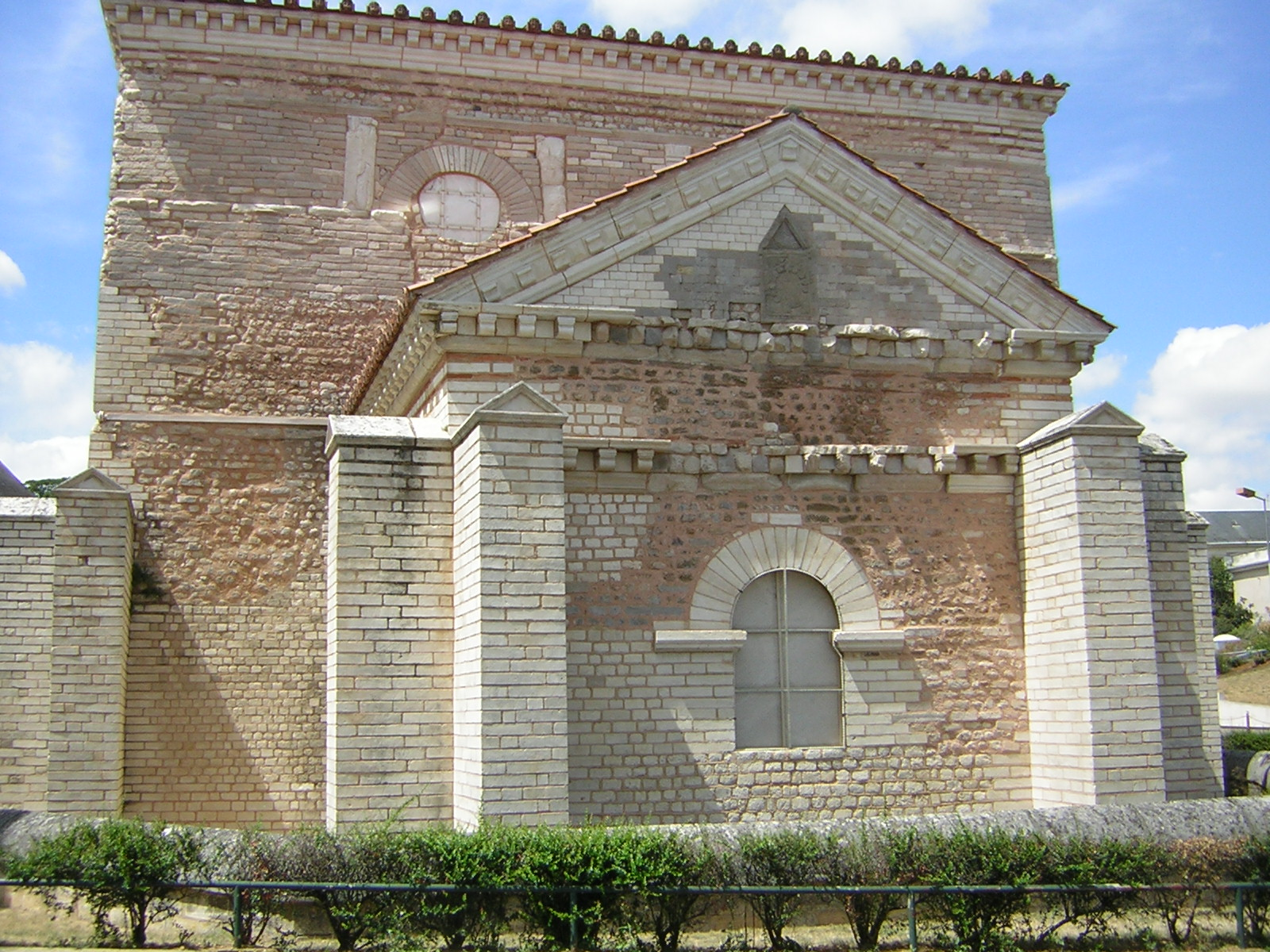
Baptistery Saint-Jean of Poitiers

== Other arts ==
By the 7th century, the abilities of Merovingian craftsmen must have been well regarded, as they were brought to England to re-introduce glass making skills, and Merovingian stonemasons were used to build English churches. Merovingian masons also employed the opus gallicum extensively and are responsible for bringing it to England and bequeathing it to the Normans, who brought it to Italy.

Very few Merovingian illuminated manuscripts survive, of which the most richly decorated is the 8th century Gelasian Sacramentary in the Vatican Library, which has geometric and animal decoration, less complex than that of the Insular art of the British Isles, but like it derived from metalwork motifs, with some influence from Late Antiquity and the Near-East. The principal centres were the Abbey of Luxeuil, an Irish foundation, and later its daughter house at Corbie Abbey.

A large Merovingian art collection in Berlin was taken by Soviet troops to Russia, where it remains to this day.

== Gallery ==
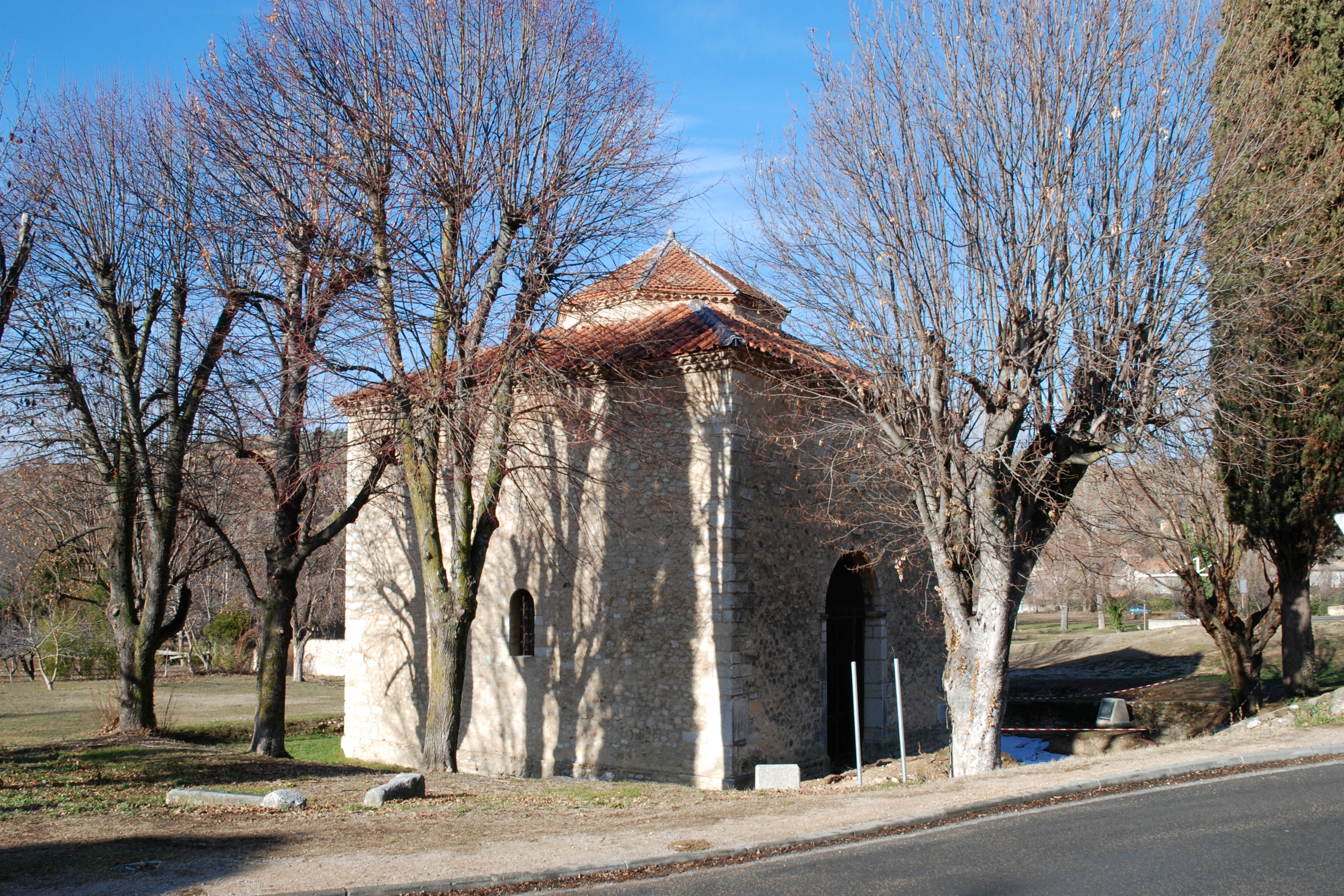
Baptistery of Riez

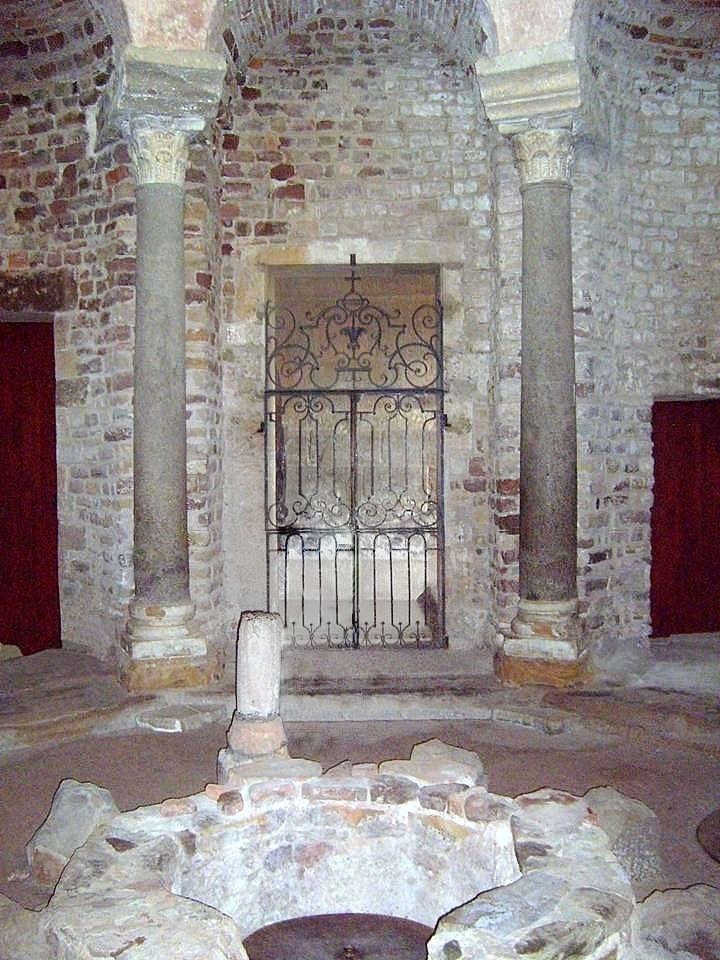
Baptistery of cathedral Saint-Léonce de Fréjus

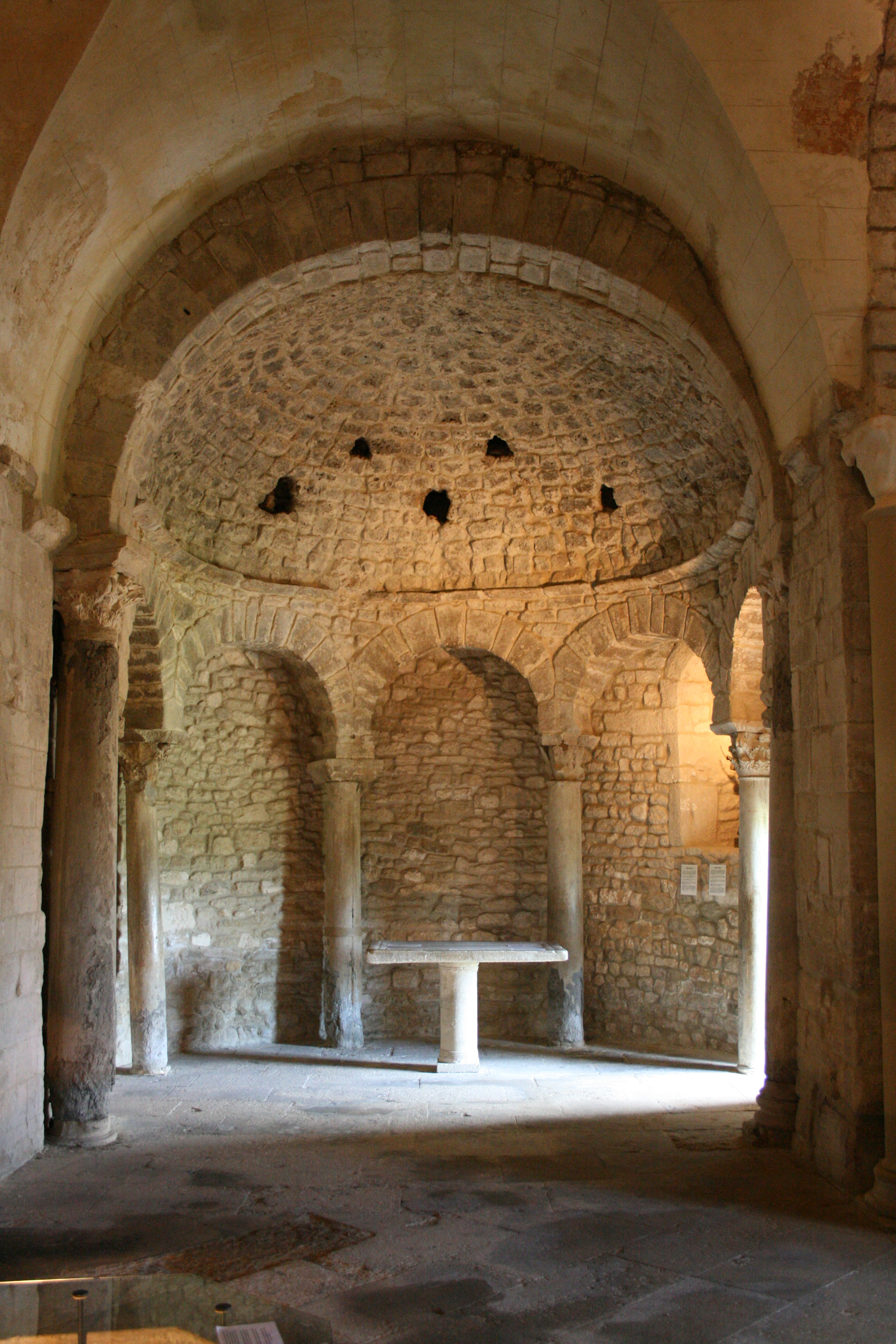
Baptistery Saint-Jean de Venasque

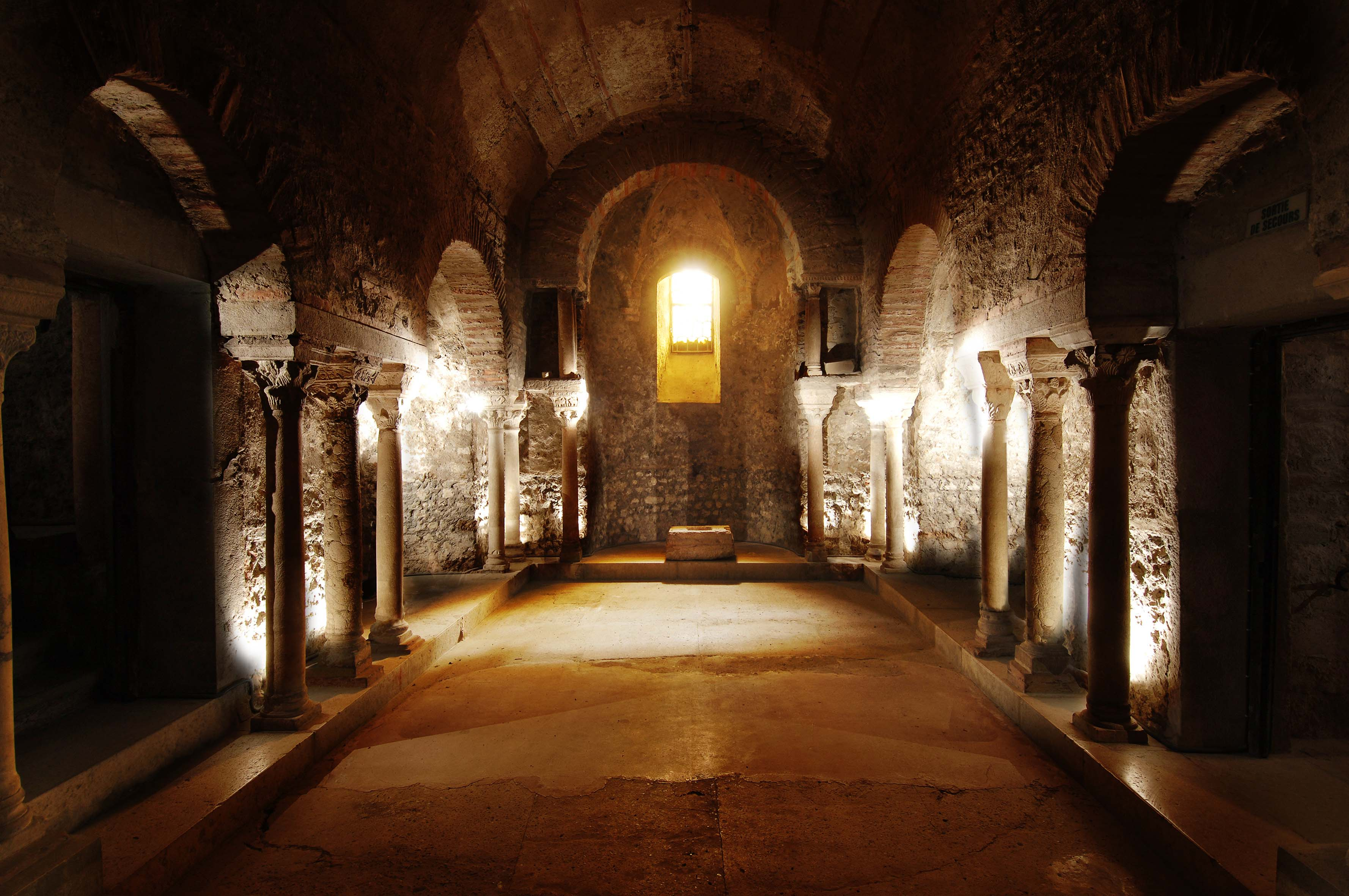
Crypt of Saint-Laurent

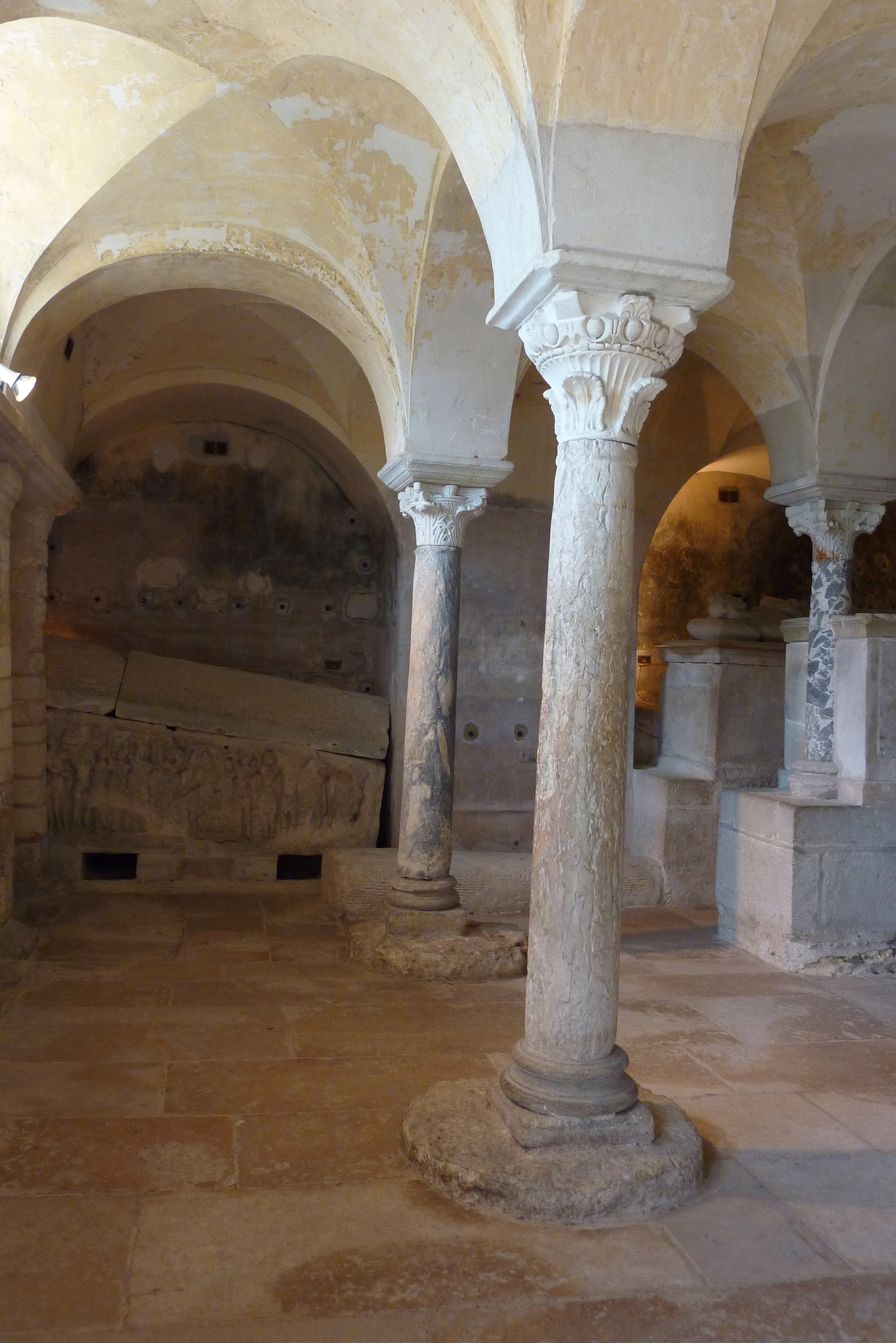
Crypt of Notre-Dame de Jouarre and sarcophagi

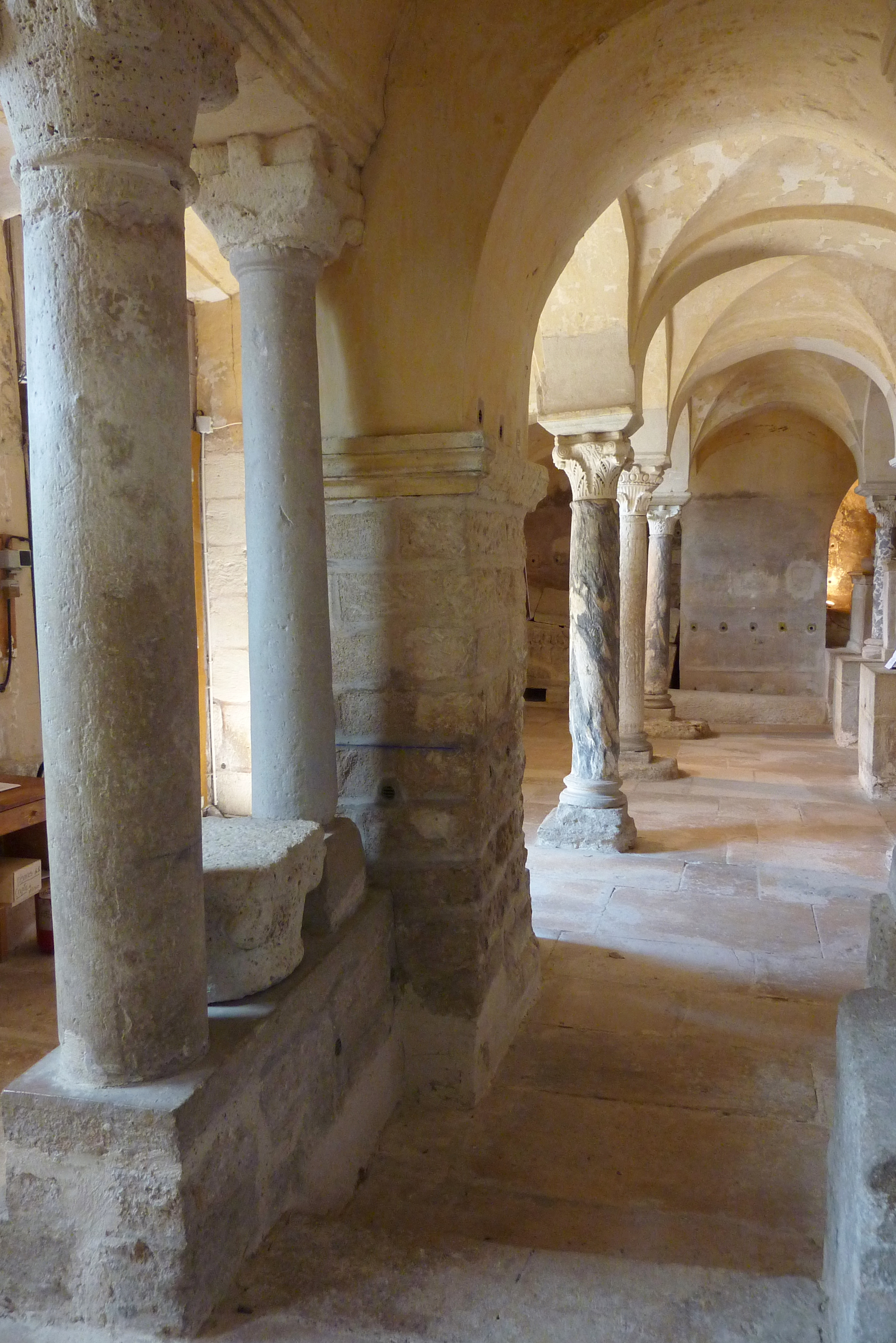
Crypt of Notre-Dame de Jouarre

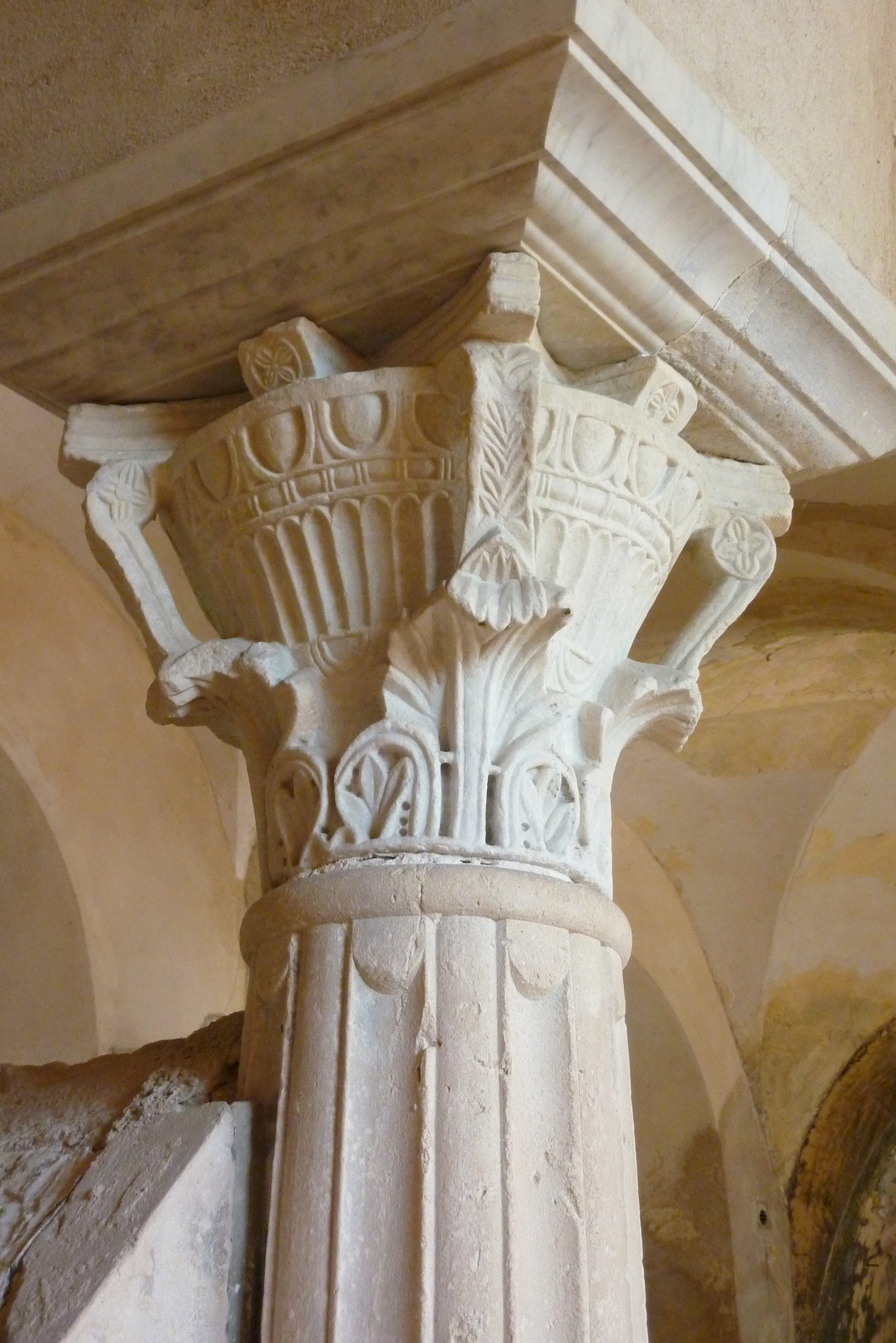
Capital in the crypt of Notre-Dame de Jouarre

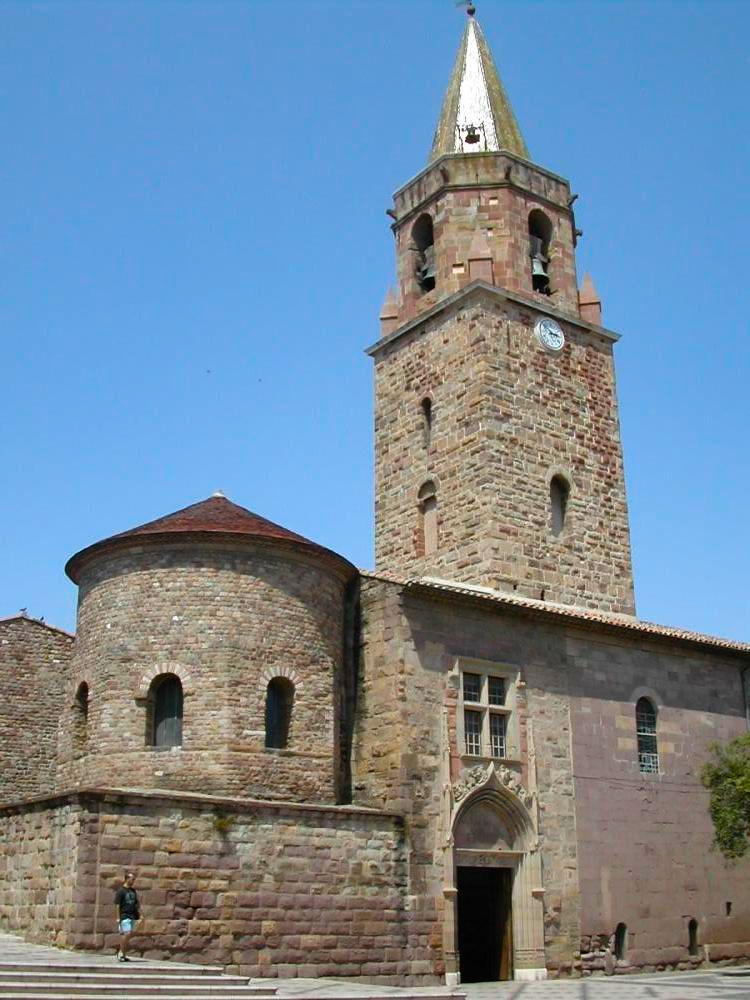
Baptistery of the cathedral Saint-Léonce in Fréjus

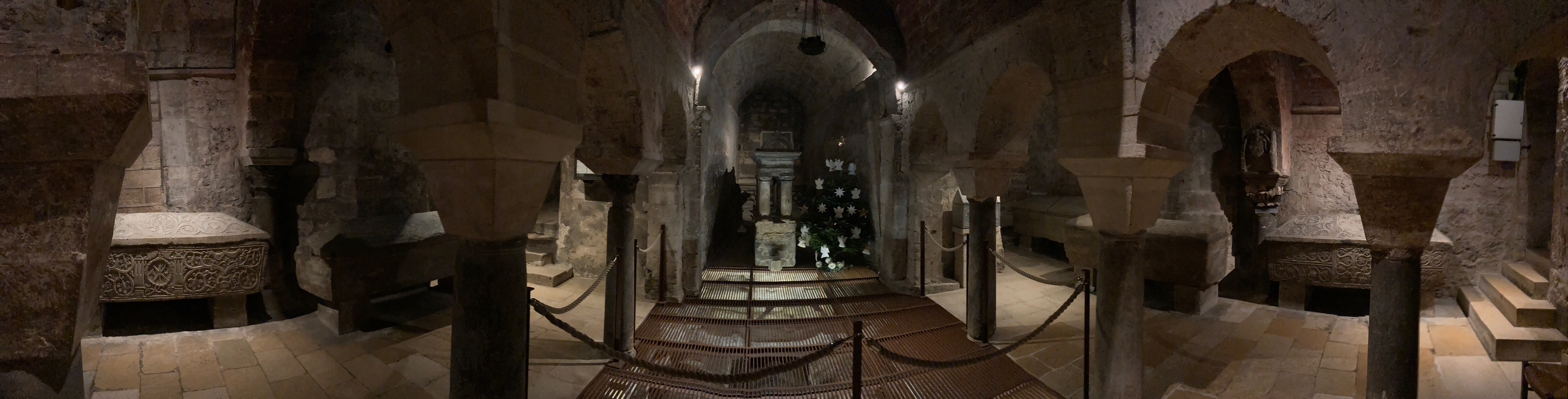
Crypt of Saint Seurin de Bordeaux

== See also ==
- Migration Period art
- List of Merovingian monasteries
- Merovingian script
