= Grenoble Archaeological Museum =

- Musée archéologique de Grenoble
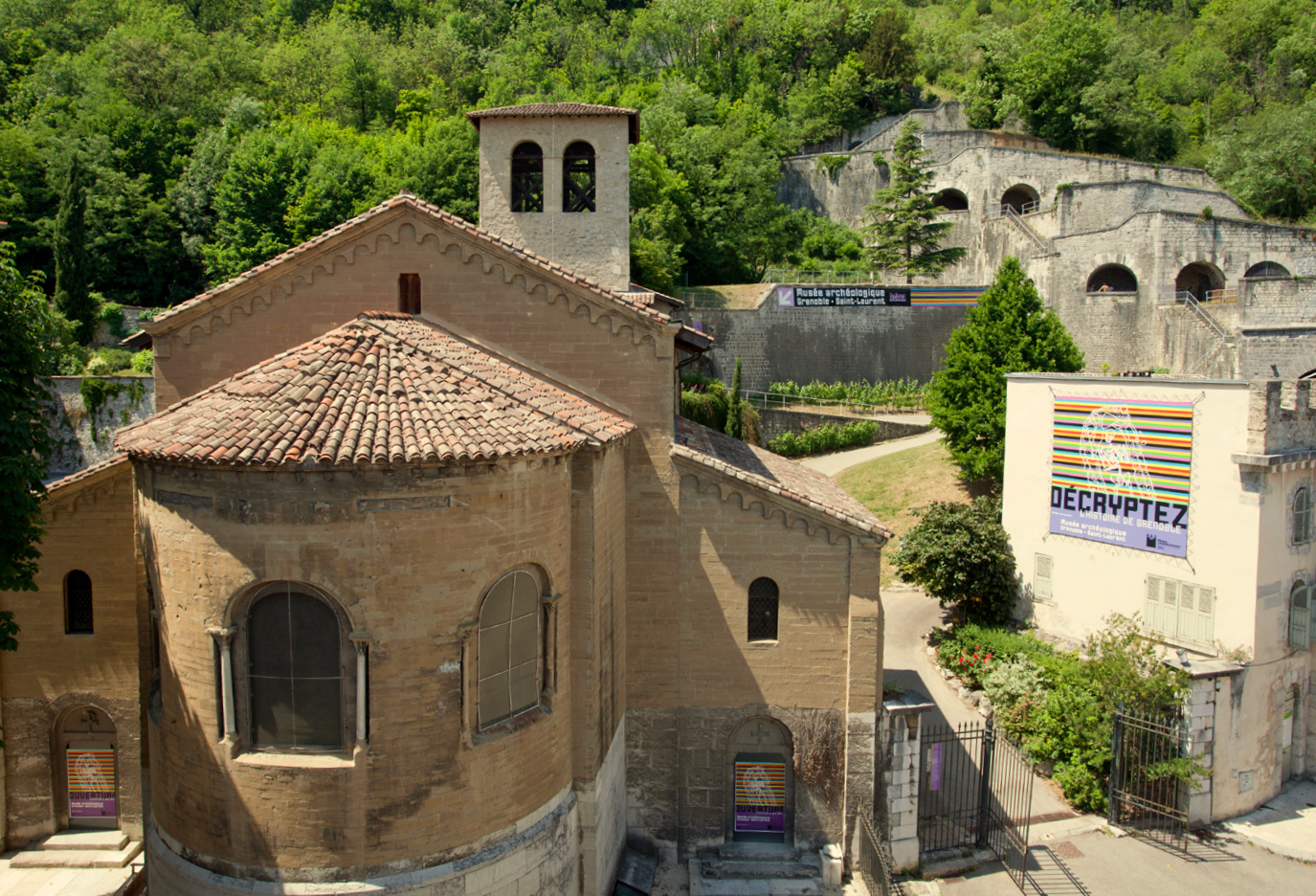
- Established: 1846
- Location: Grenoble, France
- Coordinates: 45.1977°N 5.7314°E
- Type: Archaeological museum
- Website: Saint-Laurent Archaeological Museum

Grenoble Archaeological Museum is a museum located in Grenoble, France. It occupies the historic site of Saint-Laurent at the foot of the Bastille on the right bank of the Isère.

== The building ==
Saint-Laurent church was built on the remains of a Gallo-Roman necropolis. The church itself is essentially Romanesque, but it is characterised by a complex layering of buildings and structures, among which the hidden gem is the crypt which dates from the 6th century.

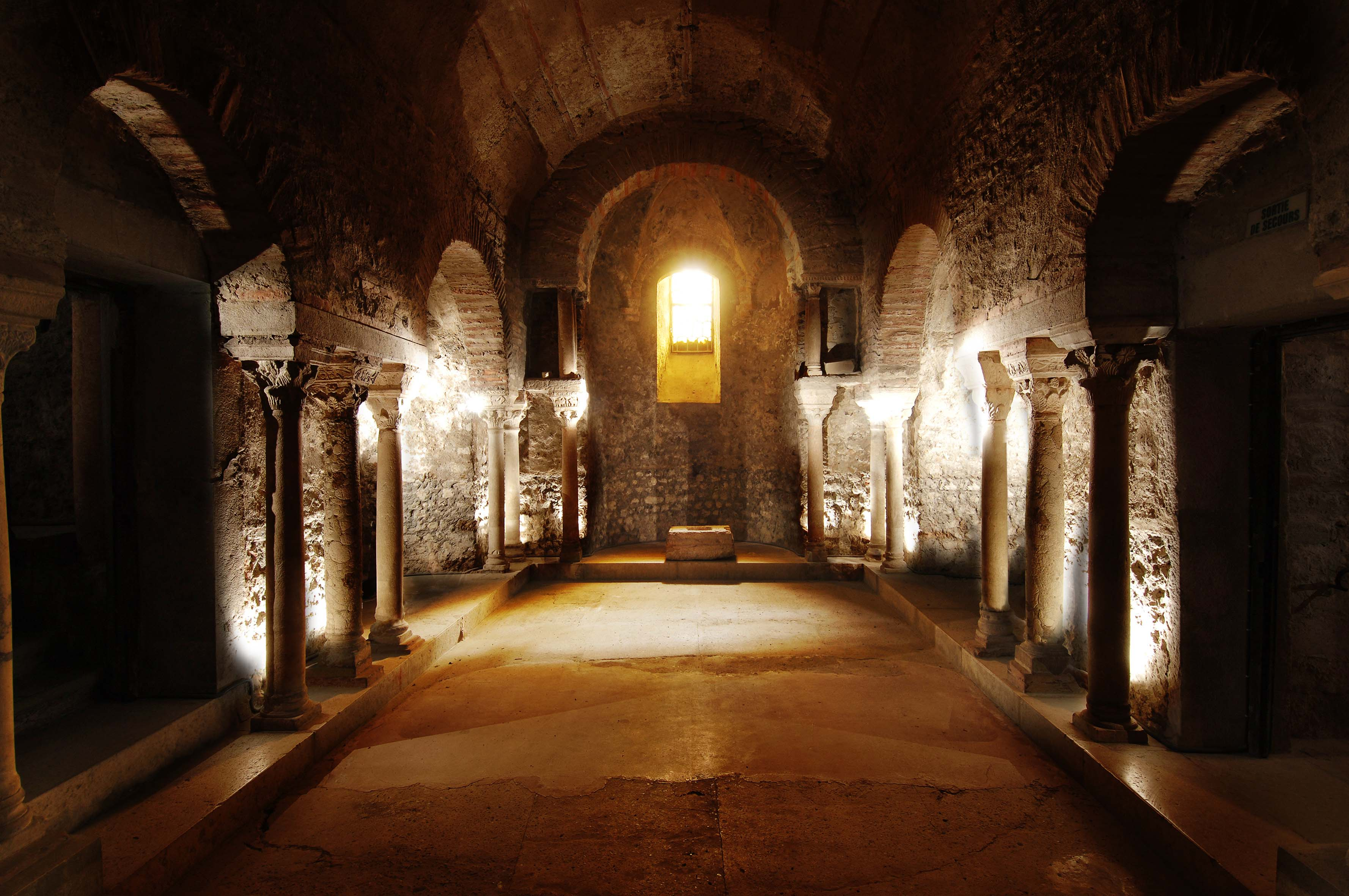
The crypt

=== Conservation ===
The crypt was classified as a historic monument in 1850. Protection was extended to other parts of the church and, in 1977, the entire site.

The church was deconsecrated in 1983, in order to become first an archaeological site and then in 1986, a museum.

== History ==
A priory associated with the church was closed in 1790, after which St Laurent had the status of a parish church. The site has been studied since the beginning of the 19th century. In 1803, the discovery of the Merovingian crypt attracted attention. In the first half of the nineteenth century, three men revived the architectural interest of this church:

- archaeologist Jacques Joseph Champollion-Figeac
- inspector general of ancient monuments Prosper Mérimée
- architect Pierre Manguin.

A first museum was created in 1846, between the church of St Laurent and a house occupied by the industrialist Xavier Jouvin. It consisted primarily of headstones covered with inscriptions, dating from the Gallo-Roman period of Cularo.

The entire site is classified as a historic monument since 10 August 1977. A museum opened in 1986, in the deconsecrated church of St Laurent, but closed from 2003 for work, and reopened to the public in May 2011, with a new original staging.

The church of St. Laurent today is a Romanesque church of the twelfth century. The conservation status of the church funeral (sixth century) excavated in the basement, with its crypt makes it a unique archaeological site in France.

The site, from the early fourth century mausoleums, has witnessed an architectural constant adaptation to changing attitudes, pagan practices to Christian beliefs.

== Bibliography ==
- La ville et la mort, Saint-Laurent de Grenoble, 2000 ans de tradition funéraire. Renée Colardelle. Bibliothèque de l'Antiquité tardive, N° 11, édit. Brepols Publishers, 413 p, 2008. ISBN 978-2-503-52818-2
