= Baptistère Saint-Jean =

Roman Catholic church in Poitiers, France

Coordinates: 46°34′46″N 0°20′55″E

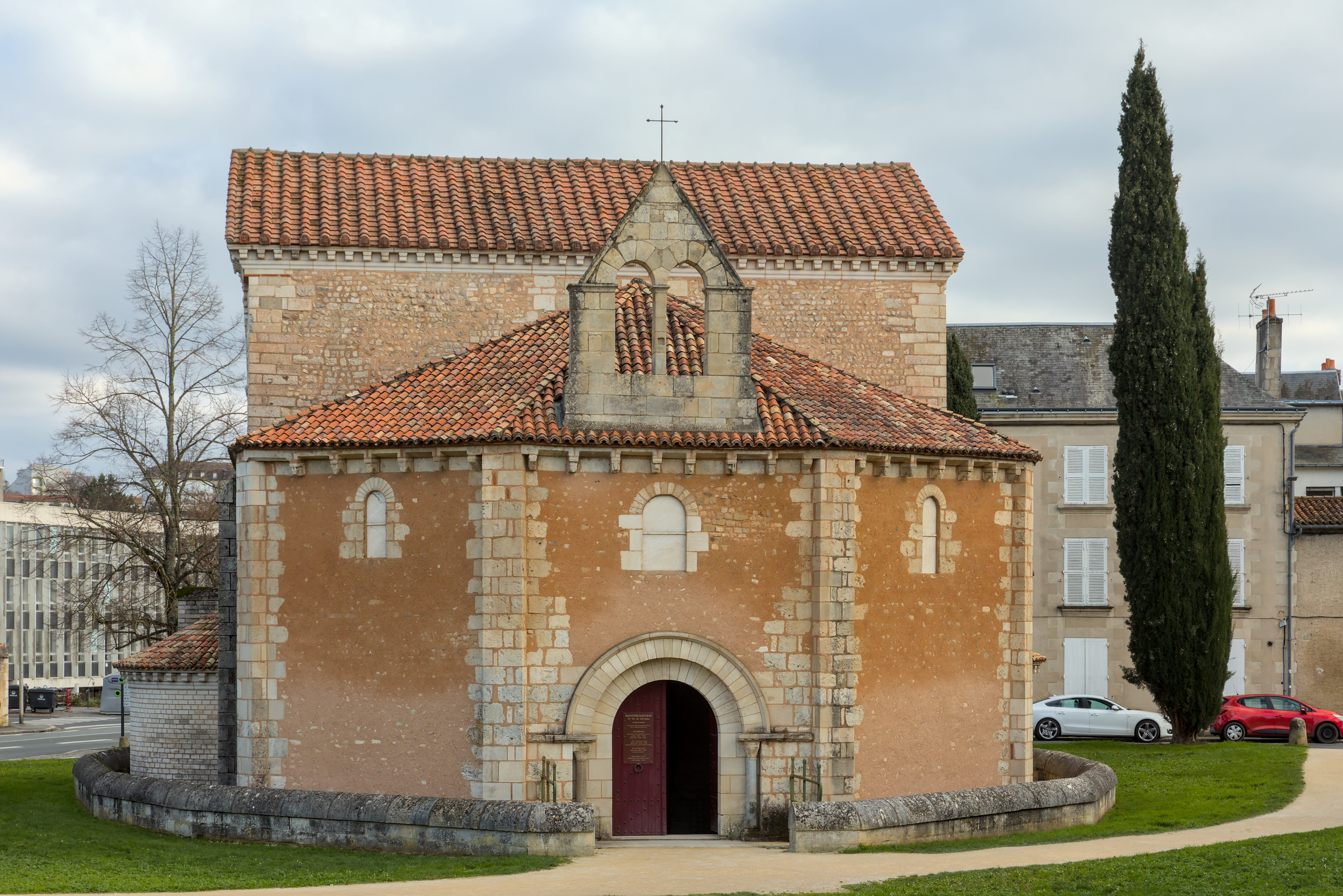
The front of the baptistery

The Baptistère Saint-Jean (Baptistery of St John) is a Roman Catholic church in Poitiers, France. It is reputed to be the oldest existing Christian building in France, and is one of the most prominent examples of Merovingian architecture.

== History ==
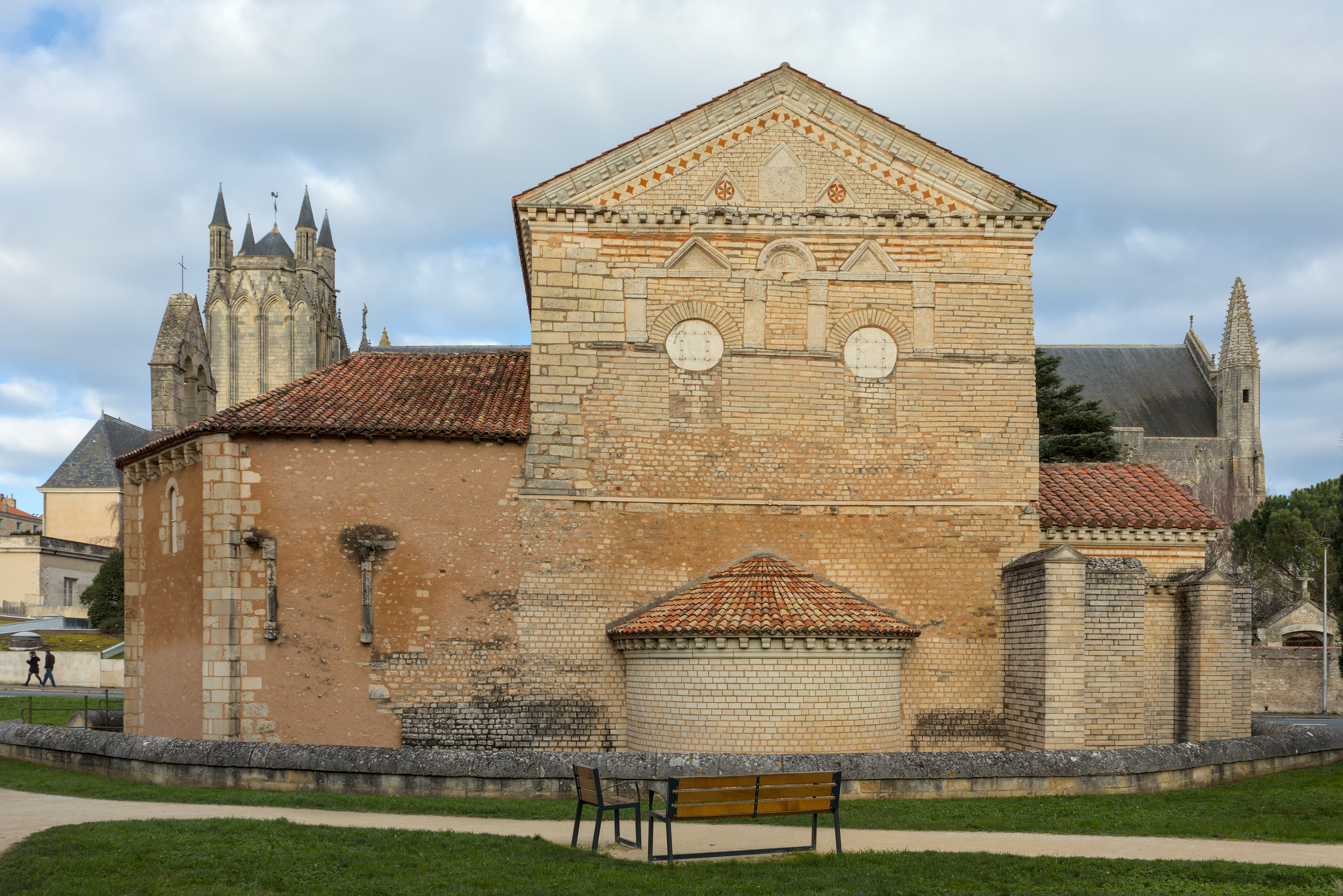
Southern façade.

=== Roman origins ===
The central part of the building was constructed around 360 as a civil building, atop the substructures of Roman buildings that were demolished in 276, in what subsequently became the episcopal quarter of the town of Poitiers, near the residence of Saint Hilary and the future cathedral. Many changes have been made to the original structure. A baptismal tank was added in the 6th century, as at that time baptism was conducted by total immersion.

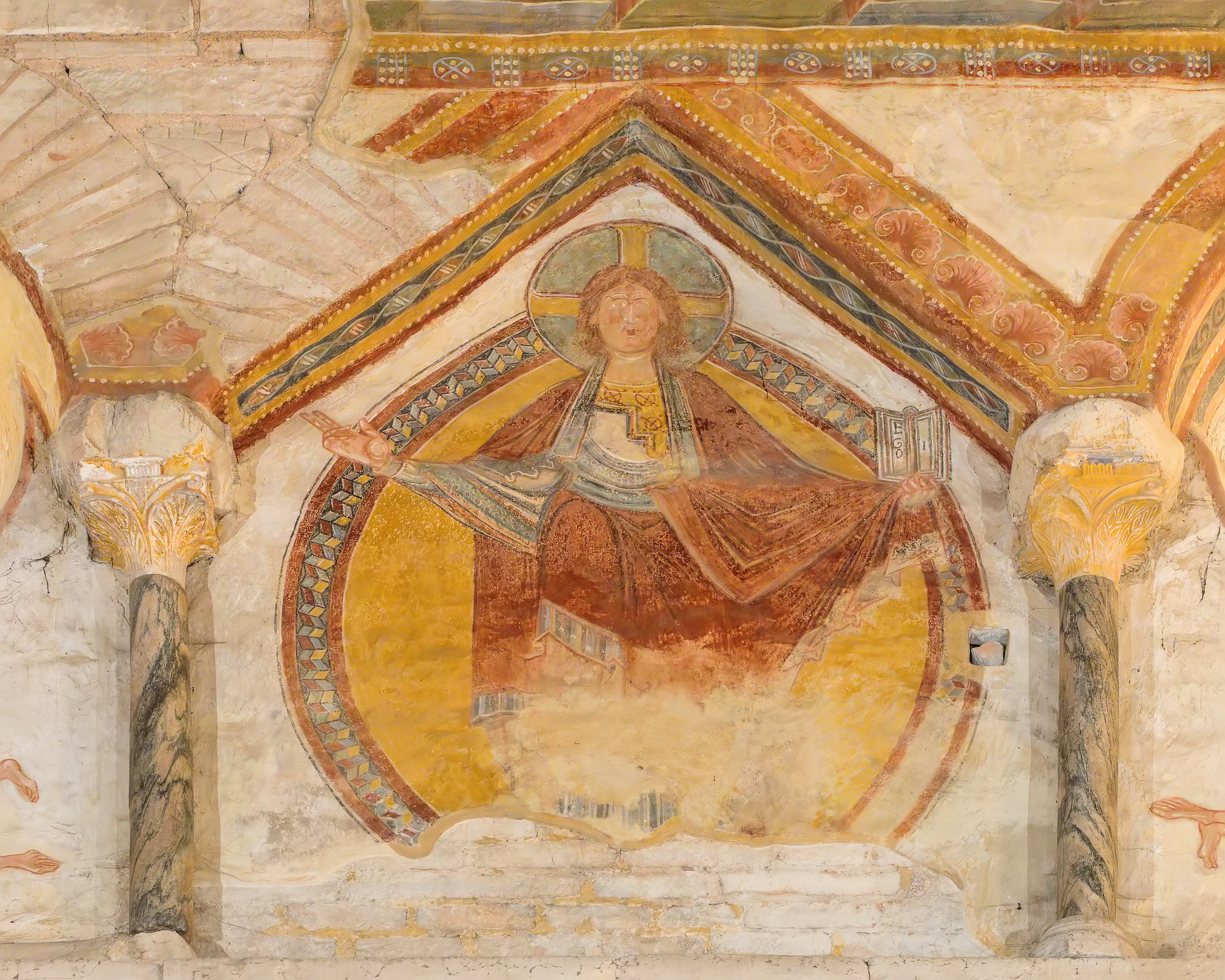
Christ in majesty, an 11th-century fresco

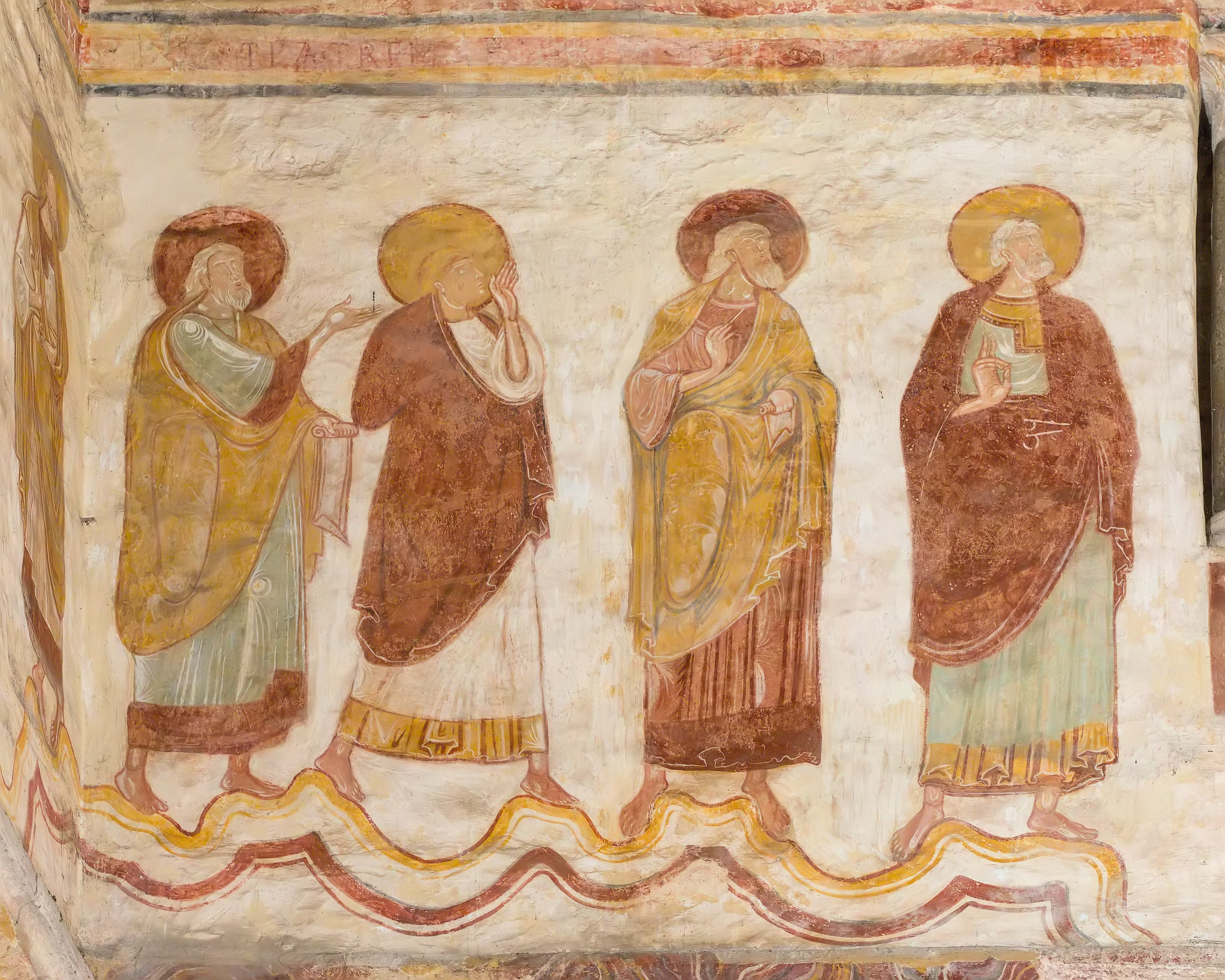
Four apostles, an 11th-century fresco

=== Early Middle Ages and reconstruction ===
The building was badly damaged during the Visigoth occupation in the fifth century. A restoration was begun after Clovis I defeated Alaric II in 507 at the Battle of Vouillé, near Poitiers. This restoration included the repair of the upper parts of the walls of the cella, the addition of three apsidioles in the form of a transept and an apse, and the decoration of outside and inside of the building.

By the tenth century the building had become dilapidated, and additions and repairs were made. These included the demolition of two original small sacristies (which were originally designated as preparation chambers for catechumens of both sexes) and the lateral apsidioles. The arms of the transept were rebuilt as apses, and the square narthex was given its present polygonal shape. It was around this time that baptism by immersion had been abandoned as a practice by the Catholic Church, and subsequently, the baptismal pool was filled in and replaced by baptismal fonts. The baptistery then became a parish church.

=== High period of the Late Middle Ages ===
From the twelfth to fourteenth century, the church was embellished by frescoes which are still visible today. They include representations of Christ's ascension, symbolic peacocks, horsemen with flowing cloaks, one of which represents Emperor Constantine, and a bust of the Holy Virgin.

=== Modern times ===
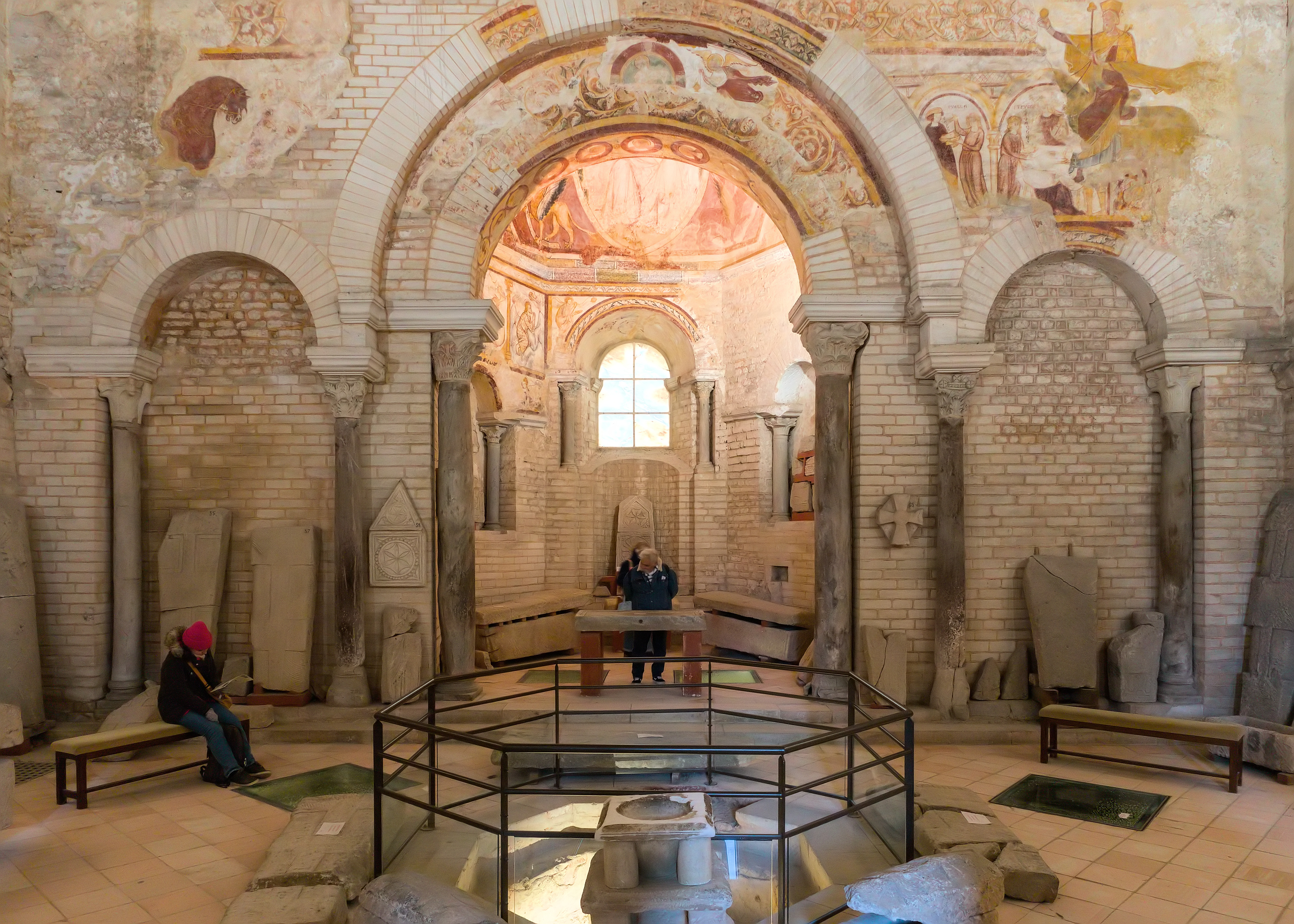
Interior

The building was abandoned in 1791 during the French Revolution, and was confiscated from the church and sold as national property to a private citizen who used it as a warehouse. It was saved from demolition by a public subscription which allowed it to be repurchased in 1834. The baptistery underwent restoration in the middle of the 20th century.

Excavations during the course of the 20th century have recovered the baptismal tank and allowed the dating of the building to be made more precise. This improved dating has ruled out the theory that the baptistery first served as a pagan temple, under which pretext it was at one time given the name Temple Saint-Jean. Instead it appears the building was indeed constructed for the purpose of baptism, a sacrament which was previously administered in the River Clain, which runs about a few hundred metres away.

Despite the centuries of demolitions, additions, and other changes, the baptistery retains its original Latin character.

The baptistery currently holds a small museum which includes many stone sarcophagi dating from the fifth to seventh centuries, many of which are vividly decorated with carved designs. It also includes remnants such as pieces of Roman columns, baptismal fonts, and other stone relics.
