= Gallium (disambiguation) =

Gallium is a chemical element with symbol Ga and atomic number 31.

Gallium may also refer to:

- Gallium experiment, a neutrino detection experiment also known as GALLEX
- Gallium scan or gallium imaging, a method for the detection of infections and cancers
- Gallium3D, a software library for 3D graphics acceleration
- GalliumOS, a Linux distribution optimized for Chromebooks

== See also ==
- Galium, a genus of plants
- Ga (disambiguation)
- Isotopes of gallium
