= Baptistery =

Building used for baptism

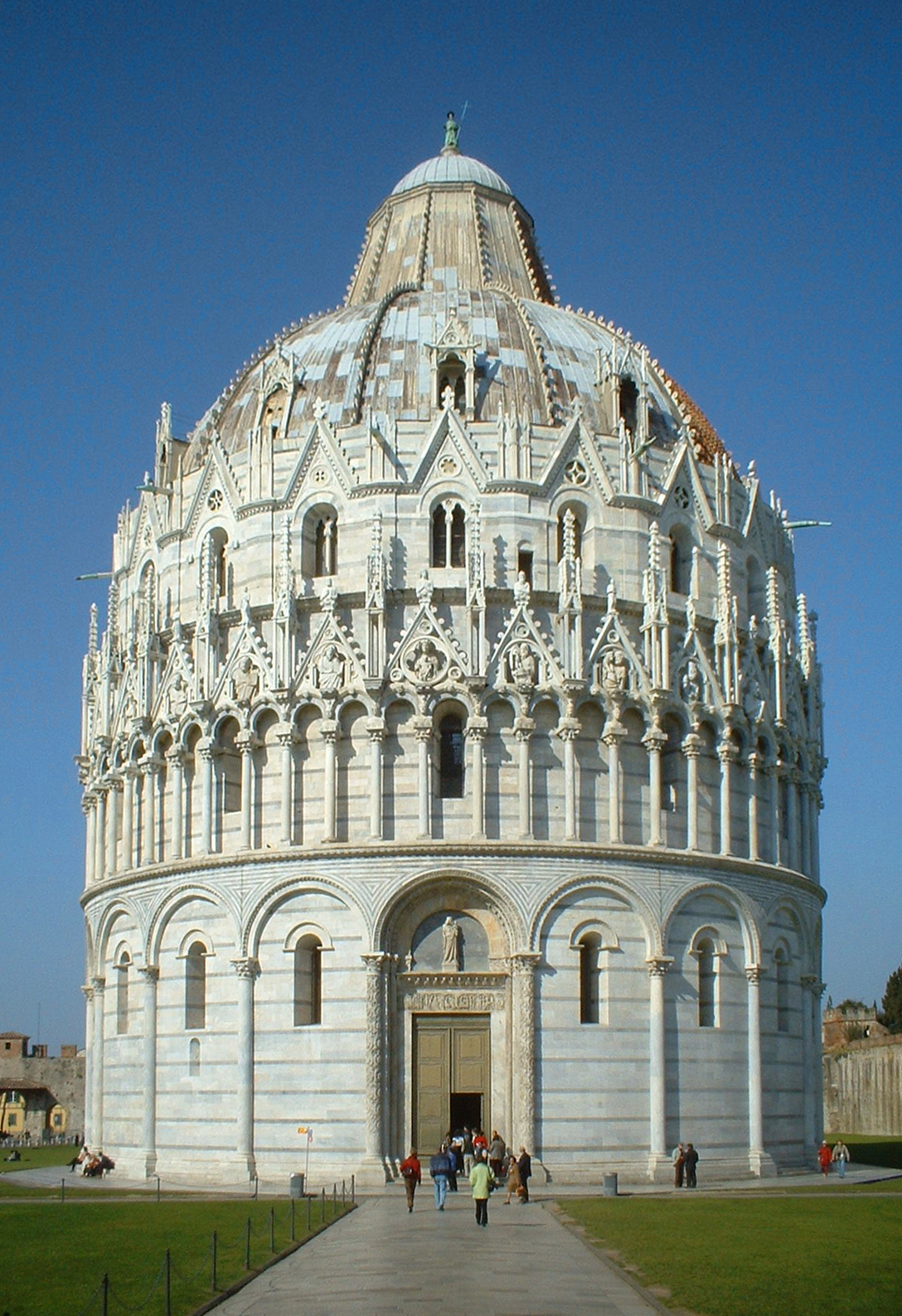
Pisa Baptistery, begun 1152, completed 1363

In Christian architecture the baptistery or baptistry (Old French baptisterie; Latin baptisterium; Greek βαπτιστήριον, 'bathing-place, baptistery', from βαπτίζειν, baptízein, 'to baptize') is the separate centrally planned structure surrounding the baptismal font. The baptistery may be incorporated within the body of a church or cathedral, and provided with an altar as a chapel. In the early Church, the catechumens were instructed and the sacrament of baptism was administered in the baptistery.

== Design ==
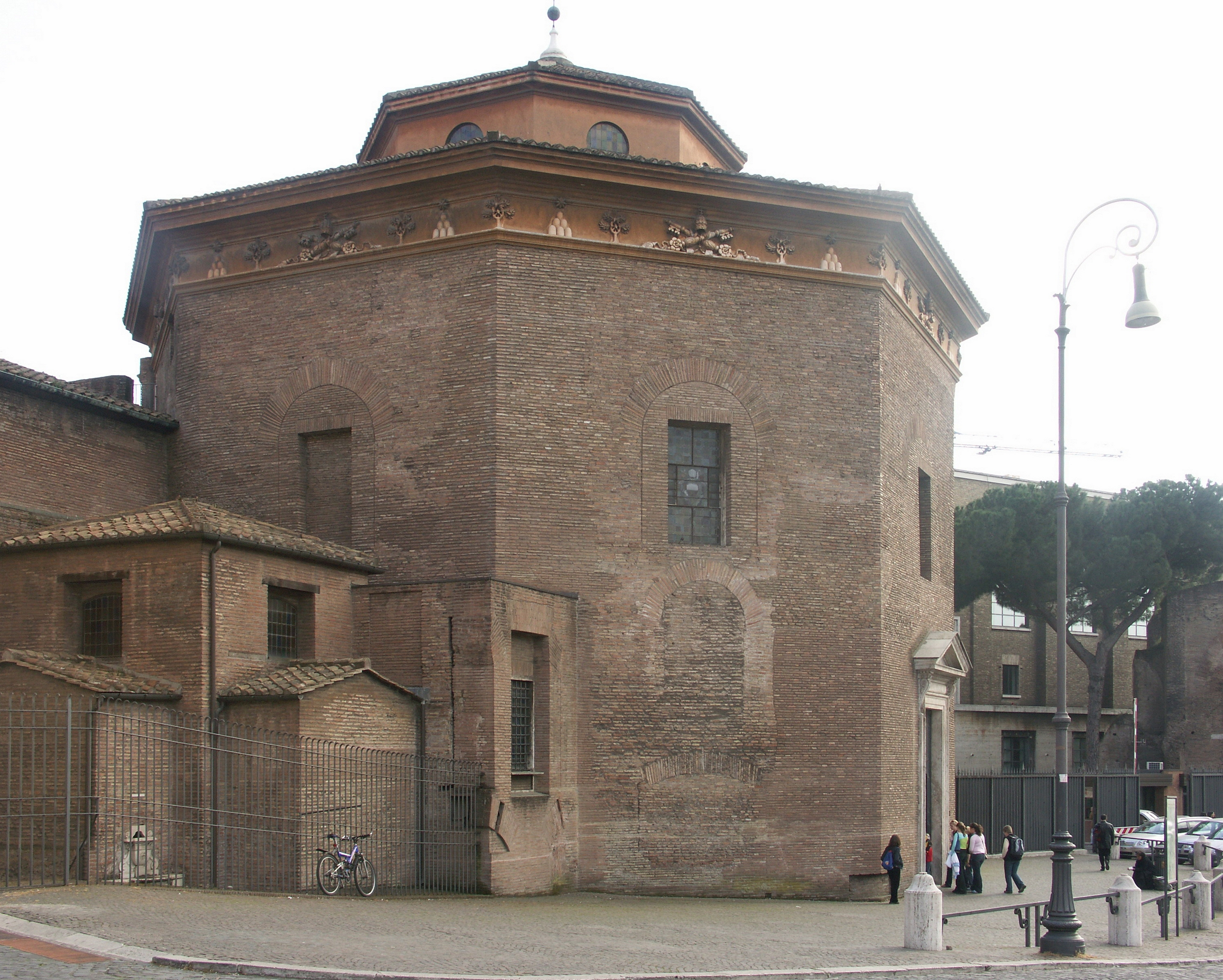
The Lateran Baptistery, Rome, 440

The sacramental importance and sometimes architectural splendour of the baptistery reflect the historical importance of baptism to Christians. Beginning in the fourth century, baptisteries in Italy were often designed with an octagonal plan. The octagonal plan of the Lateran Baptistery, the first structure expressly built as a baptistery, provided a widely followed model. The baptistery might be twelve-sided, or even circular as at Pisa.

In a narthex or anteroom, the catechumens were instructed and made their confession of faith before baptism. The main interior space centered upon the baptismal font (piscina), in which those to be baptized were thrice immersed. Three steps led down to the floor of the font, and over it might be suspended a gold or silver dove. The iconography of frescos or mosaics on the walls were commonly of the scenes in the life of Saint John the Baptist. The font was at first always of stone, but latterly metals were often used.

The Lateran baptistery's font was fed by a natural spring. When the site had been the palatial dwelling of the Laterani, before Constantine presented it to Bishop Miltiades, the spring formed the water source for the numerous occupants of the domus. As the requirements for Christian baptisteries expanded, Christianization of sacred pagan springs presented natural opportunities. Cassiodorus, in a letter written in AD 527, described a fair held at a former pagan shrine of Leucothea, in the still culturally Greek region of southern Italy. This shrine had been Christianized by converting it to a baptistery (Variae 8.33). There are also examples of the transition from miraculous springs to baptisteries from Gregory of Tours (died c. 594) and Maximus, bishop of Turin (died c. 466).

== History ==
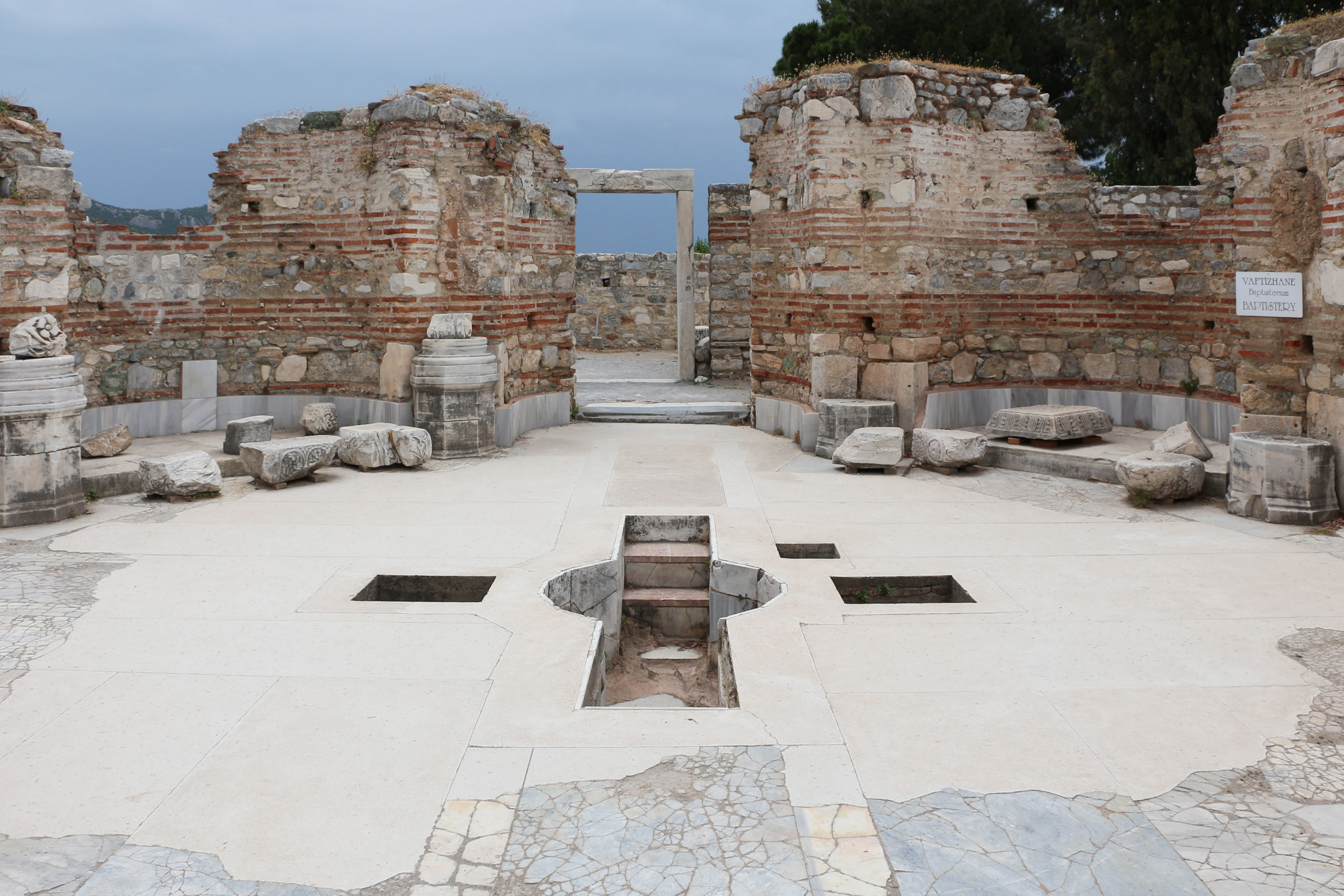
Baptistery in the Basilica of St. John in Ephesus, Turkey

Baptisteries belong to a period of the church when great numbers of adult catechumens were baptized and immersion was the rule. They did not seem to be common before the emperors Gratian, Valentinian, and Theodosius made Christianity the state religion in the Edict of Thessalonica (i.e. before the 4th century). As early as the 6th century, the baptismal font was commonly built in the porch of the church, before it was moved into the church itself. After the 9th century, with infant baptism increasingly the rule, few baptisteries were built. Some of the older baptisteries were so large that there are accounts of councils and synods being held in them. They had to be large because a bishop in the early church would customarily baptize all the catechumens in his diocese and the rite was performed only three times a year, on certain holy days. Baptisteries were thus attached to the cathedral and not to the parish churches. In the Italian countryside a pieve was a church with a baptistery on which other churches without baptisteries depended.

During the months when no baptisms occurred, the baptistery doors were sealed with the bishop's seal, a method of controlling the orthodoxy of all baptism in the diocese. Some baptisteries were divided into two parts to separate the sexes; or sometimes the church had two baptisteries, one for each sex. A fireplace was often provided to warm the neophytes after immersion.

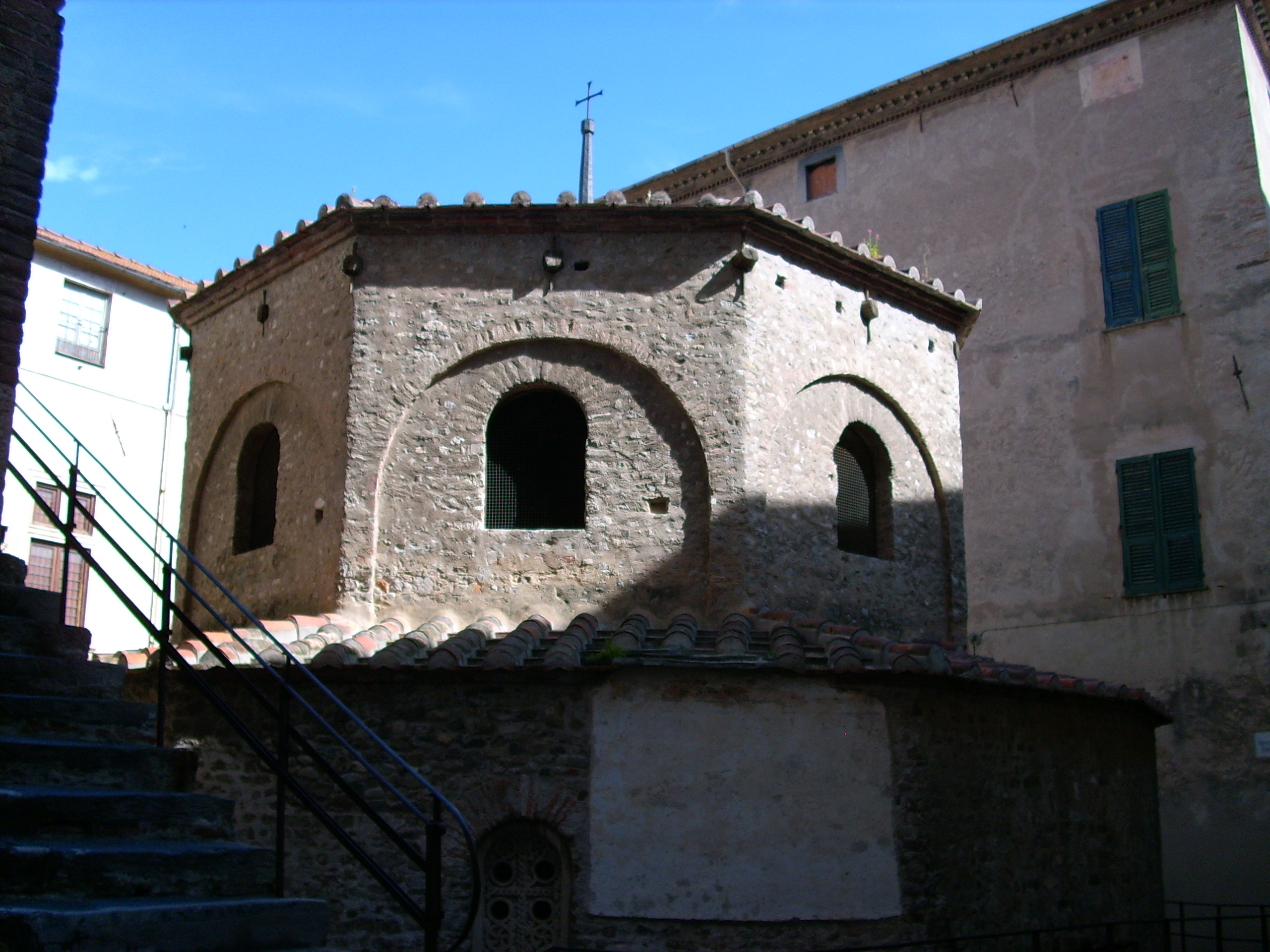
The 5th-century baptistery of Albenga in Italy

Though baptisteries were forbidden to be used as burial-places by the Council of Auxerre (578), they were sometimes used as such. The Florentine Antipope John XXIII (d. 1419) was buried in the Florence Baptistery, facing Florence Cathedral, with great ceremony, and a large and sculpturally important tomb by Donatello and his partner. Many of the early archbishops of Canterbury in England were buried in the baptistery at Canterbury.

According to the records of early church councils, baptisteries were first built and used to correct what were considered the evils arising from the practice of private baptism. As soon as Christianity had expanded so that baptism became the rule, and as immersion of adults gave place to sprinkling of infants, the ancient baptisteries were no longer necessary. They are still in general use, however, in Florence and Pisa.

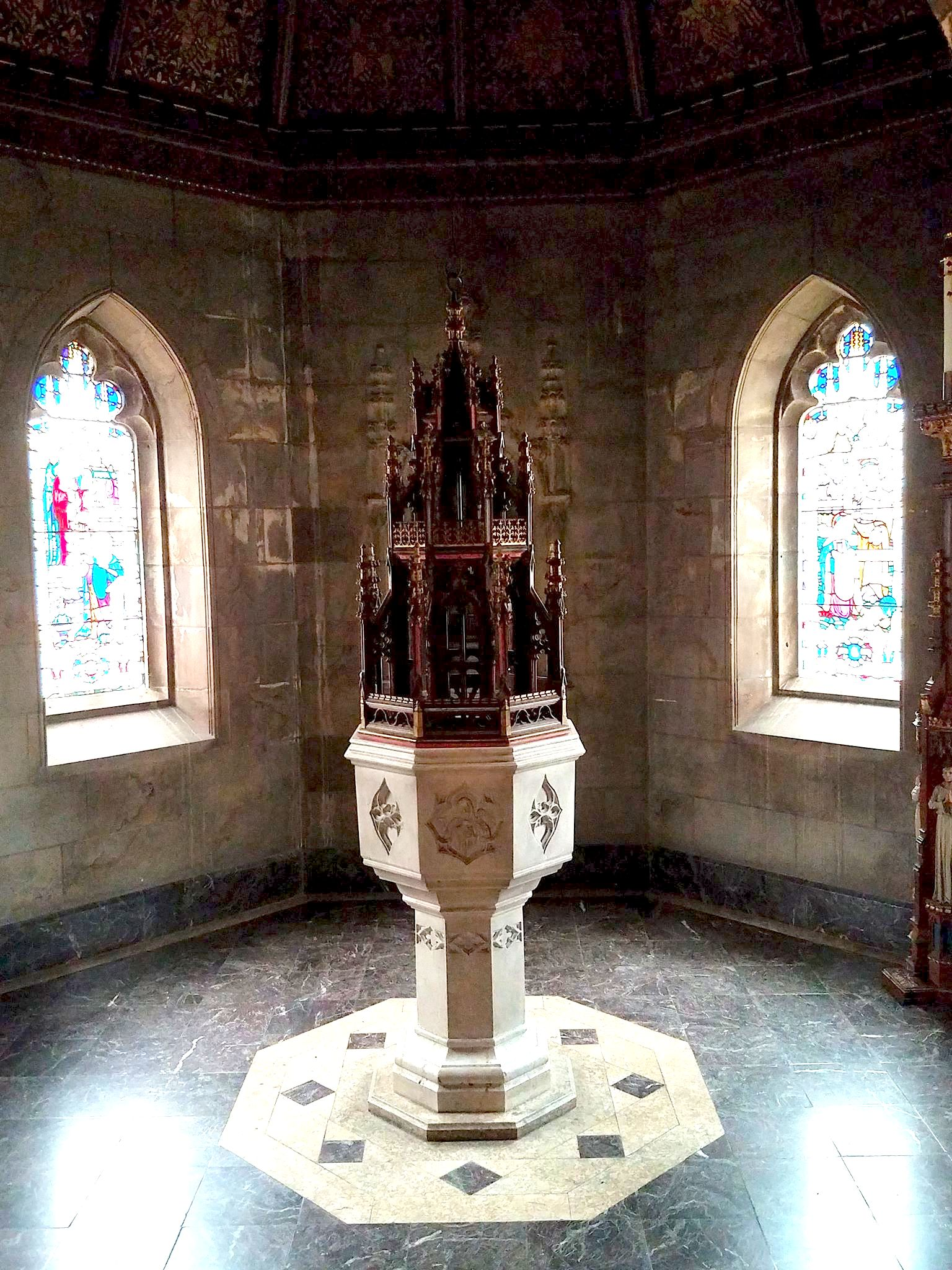
Baptistry, Church of the Good Shepherd (Rosemont, Pennsylvania)

The Lateran Baptistery must be the earliest ecclesiastical building still in use. A large part of it remains as built by Constantine. The central area, with the basin of the font, is an octagon around which stand eight porphyry columns, with marble capitals and entablature of classical form. Outside these are an ambulatory and outer walls forming a larger octagon. Attached to one side, toward the Lateran basilica, is a porch with two noble porphyry columns and richly carved capitals, bases and entablatures.

The circular church of Santa Costanza, also of the 4th century, served as a baptistery and contained the tomb of the daughter of Constantine. This is a remarkably perfect structure with a central dome, columns, and mosaics of classical fashion. Two side niches contain the earliest known mosaics of distinctively Christian subjects. In one is represented Moses receiving the Old Law, in the other Christ delivers to Saint Peter the New Law charter, sealed with the Chi Rho monogram.

The earliest surviving structure that was used as a baptistery is the tomb-like baptistery at Dura-Europas. Another baptistery of the earliest times has been excavated at Aquileia. Ruins of baptisteries have also been found at Salona and in Crete. At Ravenna are two noted baptisteries, decorated with fine mosaics. One was built in the mid-5th century, and the other in the 6th. A large baptistery decorated with mosaics was built in the 6th century at Naples.

In the East, the metropolitan baptistery at Constantinople still stands at the side of the former patriarchal Church of Holy Wisdom. Many others, in Syria for example, were found in late 19th and early 20th-century archaeological research, as were some belonging to churches of North Africa. In France the most famous early baptistery is Baptistère Saint-Jean at Poitiers. Other early examples exist at Riez, Fréjus and Aix-en-Provence. In England, a detached baptistery is known to have been associated with Canterbury Cathedral.

=== Revival in medieval Italy ===
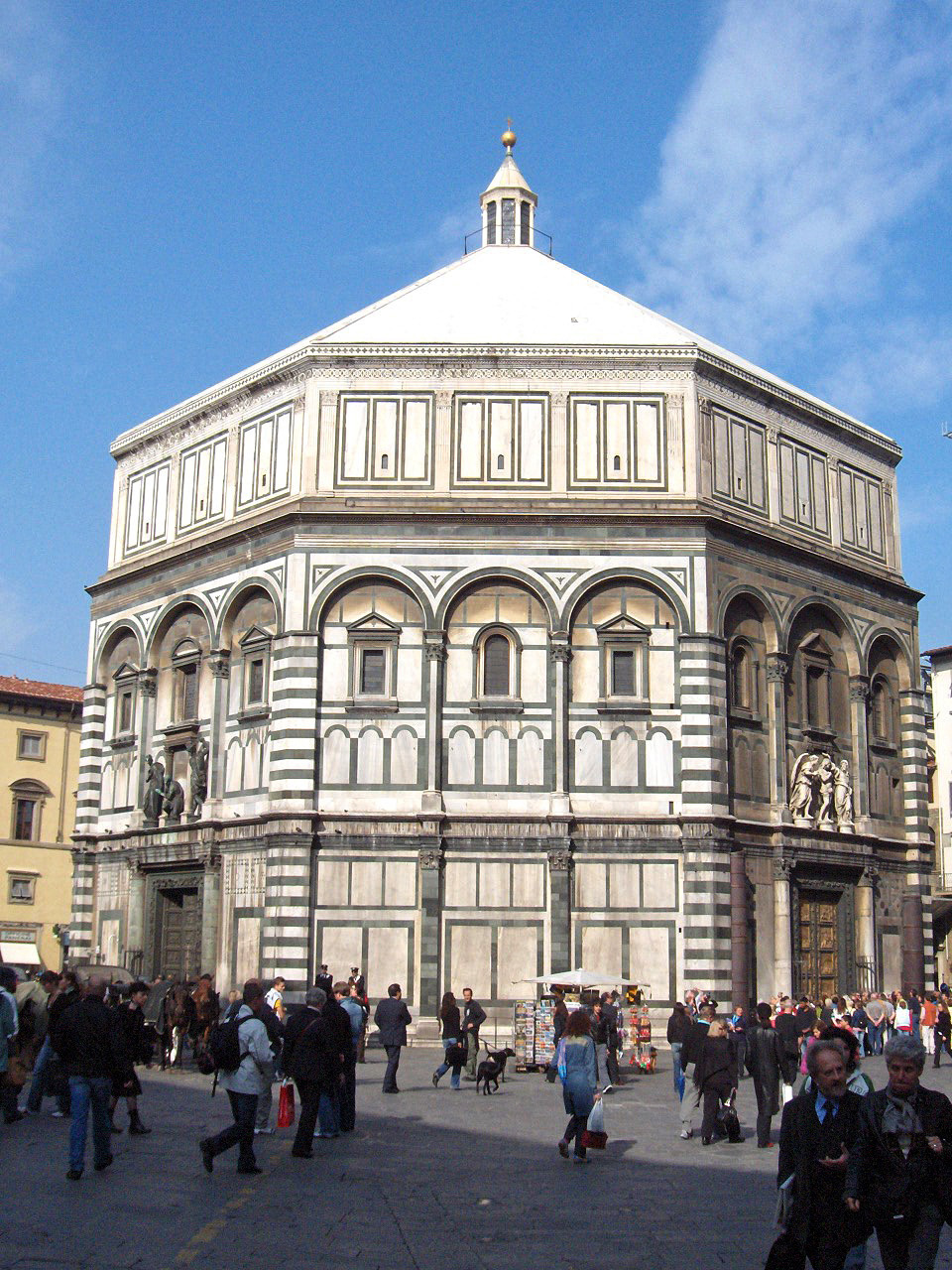
Florence Baptistery, built between 1059 and 1128

In most of Europe the early Christian practice of having a distinct baptistery building, useful when large numbers of adult catechumens were being instructed and then baptised in groups by immersion, had lapsed by the Late Middle Ages, when baptisms were normally of infants, and used sprinkling with holy water rather than immersion. Instead, smaller fonts were placed inside the church. But in north Italy separate baptisteries revived, probably largely as an expression of civic pride, placed beside the cathedral, and often with a separate campanile or bell-tower.

Among the more spectacular Romanesque and Gothic examples, the Florence Baptistery was built between 1059 and 1128, the Pisa Baptistery begun 1152 (replacing an older one) and completed in 1363, the Parma Baptistery was begun in 1196, Pistoia in 1303; all these have octagonal exteriors. The Siena Baptistery was begun in 1316, then left incomplete some decades later.

== Famous baptisteries ==
Famous Italian baptisteries include:

- Lateran Baptistery, Rome, the most significant and architecturally most influential baptistery in the Christian West, founded by Pope Sixtus III
- Parma Baptistery
- Florence Baptistery, Tuscan Romanesque-style structure associated with Florence Cathedral, rebuilt between 1059 and 1150; it contains Ghiberti's Doors of Paradise
- Pisa Baptistery, circular domed Baptistery of St John clad in white marble in the Piazza del Duomo, Pisa, built in stages from 1152 and combining Romanesque with Gothic.
- Lomello Baptistery of San Giovanni ad Fontes

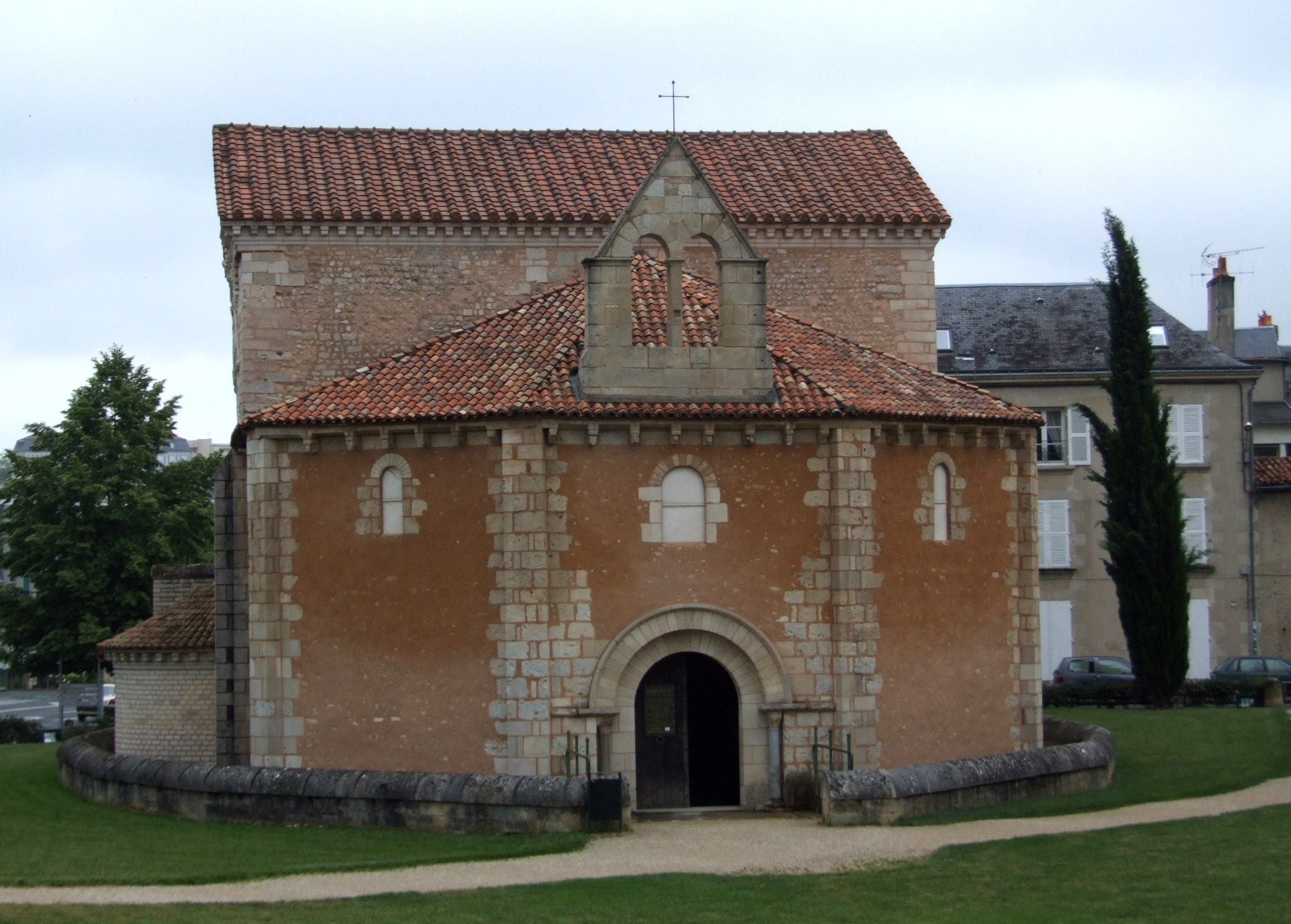
The Merovingian Baptistère Saint-Jean, Poitiers

Famous French baptisteries include:

- Baptistery of Fréjus Cathedral
- Baptistery of Aix Cathedral in Aix-en-Provence
- Baptistery of Poitiers, reputedly the oldest Christian building in France.

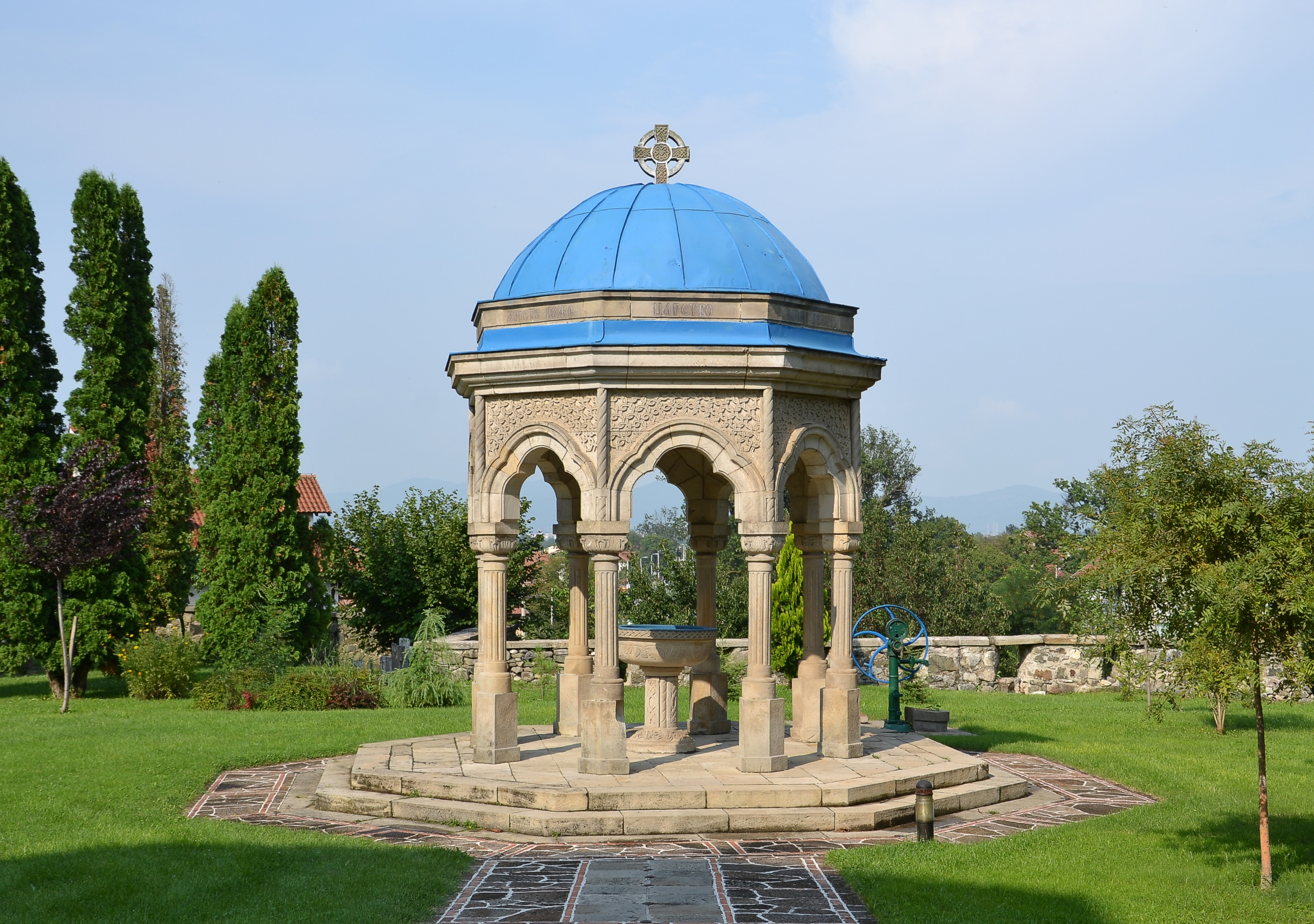
Baptistery in Žiča Monastery near Kraljevo, Serbia

Byzantine baptisteries of the Holy Land: Emmaus Nicopolis

== See also ==
- Mandi (Mandaeism)
- Church of the priest Félix and baptistry of Kélibia
- Baptistery of Bekalta
