= María Fernández (footballer) =

Spanish footballer (born 1985)

Personal information
- Full name: María Fernández Almenar
- Date of birth: 1 February 1985 (age 41)
- Place of birth: Valencia, Spain
- Height: 1.65 m (5 ft 5 in)
- Position: Left back

Senior career*
Years	Team	Apps	(Gls)
2005–2011	Levante UD	112	(5)
- * Club domestic league appearances and goals

María Fernández Almenar (born 1 February 1985) is a Spanish retired football midfielder.

== Career ==
Having initially joined as a 13 year old, Fernández played for Levante in Spain's Primera División between 2005 and 2011, winning the league in 2008. In 2011, she announced her retirement from the sport to take up a career as a teacher. She cited the low salary in women's football in Spain as a reason for retiring.

== Titles ==
- 1 Spanish league: 2008
- 2 Spanish cups: 2005, 2007
