= Opus gallicum =

Construction technique

The opus gallicum (Latin for "Gallic work") was a technique of construction whereby precise holes were created in stone masonry for the insertion of wooden beams to create a wooden infrastructure. The technique was so named because, though its presence is attested in protohistoric times, its use was common enough in Gaul to merit mention in Julius Caesar's Commentarii de Bello Gallico and was frequently employed in the Merovingian era. The technique was imported by the Normans into the Molise, where it was used extensively in the raising of castles in a short time. Gaulish masons are even known to have brought the technique from Merovingian Francia to Anglo-Saxon England during the 7th and 8th centuries and employed it in church architecture.

The opus gallicum served not only as an infrastructural base, but also a superstructural binding element designed to strengthen the masonry. While the arrangement of some of the holes found in preserved structures is often perplexing, leaving doubt as to the exact function of the beams, modern scholarship has largely moved away from the theory that the opus gallicum was a rare and inefficient method. Overall the technique was not uncommon in the Middle Ages.

== Sources ==
- European Commission: Raphaël Programme. The Normans, a European people: The Norman heritage, 10th – 12th century. Architectural Heritage: Italy — the Molise §8 Fortifications and castles: Fortifications — The opus gallicum in the fortifications. 2004. Contains photographs of Molisian examples.
- Gravett, Christopher, and Nicolle, David. The Normans: Warrior Knights and their Castles. Osprey Publishing: Oxford, 2006.
- Gilbert, Edward. "Brixworth and the English Basilica." The Art Bulletin, Vol. 47, No. 1. (Mar., 1965), pp 1–20.
