= Juan Almenar =

15th century Spanish physician

Juan Almenar was a Spanish physician of the 15th century, and author of one of the first books on syphilis, De lue venerea sive de morbo gallico (Venice, 1502). He was born in Valencia.

== Works ==
- Libellus ad evitandum et expellendum morbum Gallicum, Italian books before 1601. OCLC 467120011
- Opusculum perutile de curatione morbi (ut vulgo dici solet) Gallici, 1528. OCLC 1102275560
- Libelli duo de morbo Gallico : opusculum perutile de curatione morbi (ut vulgo dici solet) gallici [Libellus ad evitandum et expellendum morborum Gallicum], Lugduni, 1529. OCLC 256608330
- Liber de morbo Gallico in quo diversi in tali materia scribentes medicinae continentur auctores. [5], Libellus de morbo Gallico, qui ita perfecte eradicare ipsum ostendit, ut numquam revertatur, 1535. OCLC 310915371
