= Camille de La Croix =

Belgian Jesuit priest and archologist

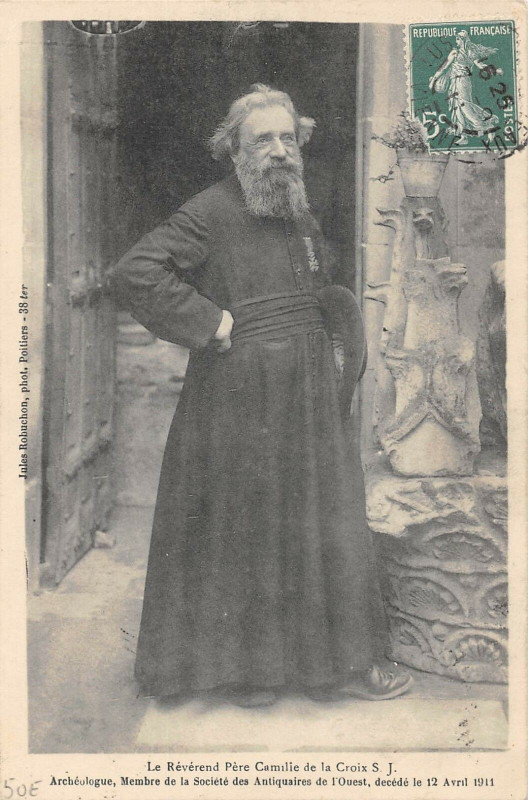
- Photography (Jules Robuchon).
- Born: July 21, 1831; Mont-Saint-Aubert, Belgium
- Died: April 13, 1911 (79 years old); Poitiers (France)
- Other name: Father de La Croix
- Occupations: Historian, archaeologist
- Title: Société des antiquaires de l'Ouest
- Honours: Legion of Honour

Camille de La Croix (born Camille Adolphe Ferdinand Marie de La Croix on July 21, 1831, in Mont-Saint-Aubert, Belgium) was a Belgian Jesuit priest who made significant contributions to both music education and archaeology. He resided in Poitiers, France, from 1864 until his death on April 13, 1911.

After beginning his theological studies, de La Croix moved to France, where he was ordained a priest in 1864. His interest in archaeology emerged in 1877, leading him to conduct numerous excavations. His work focused particularly on ancient and early Christian periods, and he is noted for discovering the ancient site of Sanxay, the Saint-Jean Baptistery in Poitiers, and the Hypogeum of the Dunes in the same city.

Although his occasionally empirical methodology was not universally accepted and his conclusions were sometimes contested, his contributions were recognized with his appointment as a Knight in the National Order of the Legion of Honour in 1896.

== Biography ==
=== Early life and education ===
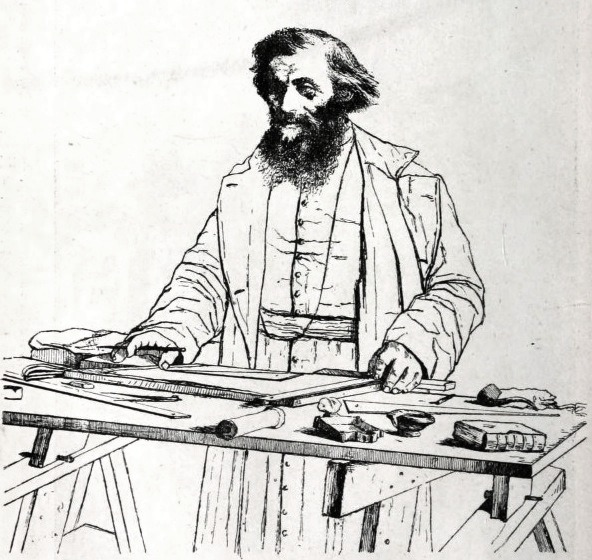
Portrait (François-Guillaume Dumas, 1883).

Camille de La Croix was born on July 21, 1831, at the family estate of Château du Rinval in Mont-Saint-Aubert, a village that is now part of the city of Tournai in Belgium. His ancestors, the de La Croix d'Ogimont family, were members of a noble family that originated in Valenciennes and had settled in the Tournai region since the 17th century. Consequently, he owned a considerable personal fortune at the outset of his career.

He was resolved to pursue a vocation in the religious life, as had his two elder sisters and younger brother. Accordingly, he commenced his studies at the Jesuit college in exile in Brugelette, in consequence of the anti-religious legislation that was then in force in France. He subsequently attended the Saint-François-Xavier High School in Vannes, where he was able to follow the same teachers who had returned to France in 1850.

He began his spiritual and religious training on January 30, 1854, at the Jesuit novitiate in Issenheim, Alsace. There, he met Father Magloire Tournesac, a musician and architect from Sarthe, an inspector of historical monuments, under whom he learned to master the art of drawing and architecture. However, he was assigned to direct musical studies at the Jesuit college in Metz.

=== Settlement in Poitiers ===
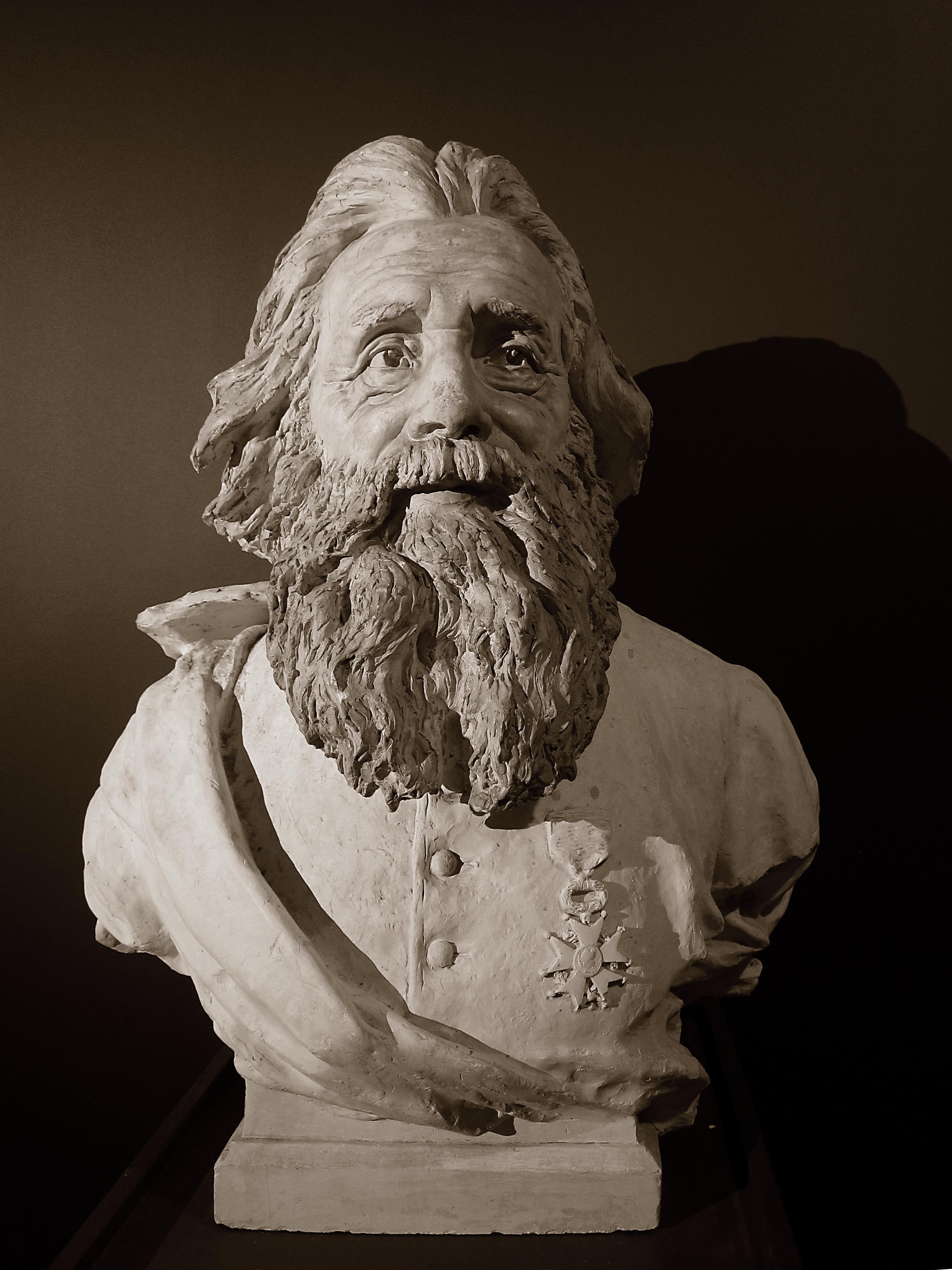
Bust of Camille de La Croix (Musée Sainte-Croix).

He was ordained a priest in 1864 and subsequently appointed to the recently constructed Saint Joseph College in Poitiers, where he performed the same duties he had done previously in Metz. During this period, he established relationships with several composers, including Auber, Félicien David, Charles Gounod, and Louis Lambillotte, with whom he collaborated on editing their works.

In 1877, he fully and permanently transitioned his focus to archaeological research. The Bishop of Poitiers, Louis-Édouard Pie, relieved him of his teaching responsibilities, allowing him to dedicate his time exclusively to archaeology. Although he had taken up permanent residence in France, which he considered his second homeland; nevertheless, he consistently asserted his true nationality. For example, at the Sanxay excavation site, he flew the French and Belgian flags. It was as a foreigner that, after numerous archaeological discoveries to his credit, the French government awarded him the title of Knight of the Legion of Honour in 1896. Notably, the decree was indeed issued by the Minister of Foreign Affairs. He died at his modest residence in Poitiers on April 13, 1911. Financially, he was impoverished, having expended his entire fortune on the numerous excavation campaigns he spearheaded. He bequeathed his archives, collections, library, and the land of the Hypogeum of the Dunes, which he had acquired to safeguard the site, to the Société des Antiquaires de l'Ouest. Camille de La Croix was laid to rest in the Chilvert Cemetery in Poitiers.

== Homage and memory ==
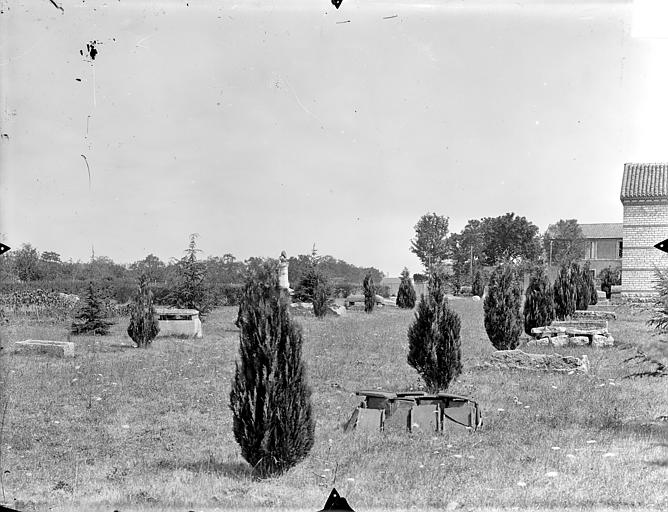
Park of the hypogeum; in the background, the monument to Camille de La Croix.

- A commemorative monument (funded by subscription), topped by a bronze bust created by the artist Aimé Octobre, stands in the park that houses the Merovingian Hypogeum of the Dunes. A plaster copy of the bust is kept at the Sainte-Croix Museum in Poitiers.
- Two public roads in Béruges and Poitiers—the latter of which runs alongside the Hypogeum of the Dunes—have been designated "rue du Père de La Croix."

== Contributions to archaeology ==
Camille de La Croix's dedication to archaeological research first became evident in 1877. Despite occasional visits to Paris to deliver lectures or instruct at the École du Louvre, his primary objective was to return to Poitiers to resume his excavations, as documented by Octave Mirbeau, a former student at the Vannes College with whom he shared a similar academic background.

He was willing to initiate archaeological excavations without assistance and to finance them with his funds (renting or even purchasing land, buying equipment, paying the workers). This archaeologist, described as "hardworking and tenacious," was occasionally criticized for a lack of method and rigor in his work. He lacked formal archaeological training, which led to the irreversible loss of information. He directed his excavations according to preconceived ideas, did not maintain a detailed excavation journal, and did not compile an inventory of archaeological artifacts, which were sometimes dispersed as gifts to his friends. Nevertheless, his intuitive insights were seldom misguided, and he consistently produced meticulous site plans. His character elicited a multifaceted response, encompassing both criticism and praise, within the context of a political environment that was often anti-religious.

As the founder of Poitevin archaeology, Father de La Croix was above all a religious man. He frequently sought to trace the history of local Christian martyrs and saints through the excavations he undertook.

=== Excavations and surveys ===
The initial archaeological excavations conducted by Father de La Croix in 1877 were undertaken at the Church of Saint Hilaire de la Celle monastery in Poitiers. The objective was to ascertain whether any traces of the burial of Saint Hilaire could be found. In 1877–1878, he successfully identified the Roman baths of Poitiers and mapped them in detail. The discovery and comprehensive excavation of the Hypogeum of the Dunes from 1878 to 1880 solidified his reputation as an archaeologist.

Another significant discovery was the ancient site of Sanxay, which he excavated from 1880 to 1883. During this period, he uncovered the majority of the site's main features. However, some structures were unfortunately destroyed during the excavation process, and many others had to be reburied after the project. Subsequently, this discovery was regarded as the most significant in Gaul since the discovery of the Temple of Mercury at Puy-de-Dôme. In 1884, the General Council of Vienne requested that he create an archaeological map of the department, spanning from the Iron Age to the Merovingian period. To this end, he conducted excavations at numerous sites until 1896. However, this map was never completed or published.

In Poitiers, Father de La Croix undertook comprehensive research on the Saint-Jean Baptistery, commencing in 1890 and concluding between 1898 and 1902. He was able to discern the edifice's true purpose and corroborate the findings initially documented by Étienne-Marie Siauve at the beginning of the century. (Note: In the nineteenth century, the structure was referred to as the "Saint-Jean Temple" due to the long-standing belief, originating in the seventeenth century and documented in the epitaph of Dom Mabillon, that it housed the remains of Claudia Varenilla, the wife of a legate proconsul of Aquitaine Gaul who perished in 1592.) From the mid-1890s onwards, he directed many excavations in other departments. In 1895, he researched the pillar of Yzeures-sur-Creuse (Indre-et-Loire), where he made significant advancements beyond the scope of the Société archéologique de Touraine, which was also involved in investigating these remains. The following year, he conducted research at the site of the Saint-Philibert Abbey in Saint-Philbert-de-Grand-Lieu (Loire-Atlantique). He posited that this building was an ancient monument that had been remodeled several times, a theory that was later disproved. Between 1896 and 1897, he identified the theater and temples of the ancient site of Villeret (Canetonum) in Berthouville (Eure), where a treasure had already been discovered. In 1898-1899, he excavated the Saint-Maur Abbey in Glanfeuil (Maine-et-Loire).

In the initial decade of the 20th century, Camille de La Croix's physical presence on the field was less pronounced. However, from 1901 to 1908, he closely monitored the excavations conducted by Maurice Laporte-Bisquit, the newly appointed proprietor, at the Gallo-Roman theater site in Bouchauds, Saint-Cybardeaux, Charente.

Drawings and plans of sites excavated by Camille de La Croix

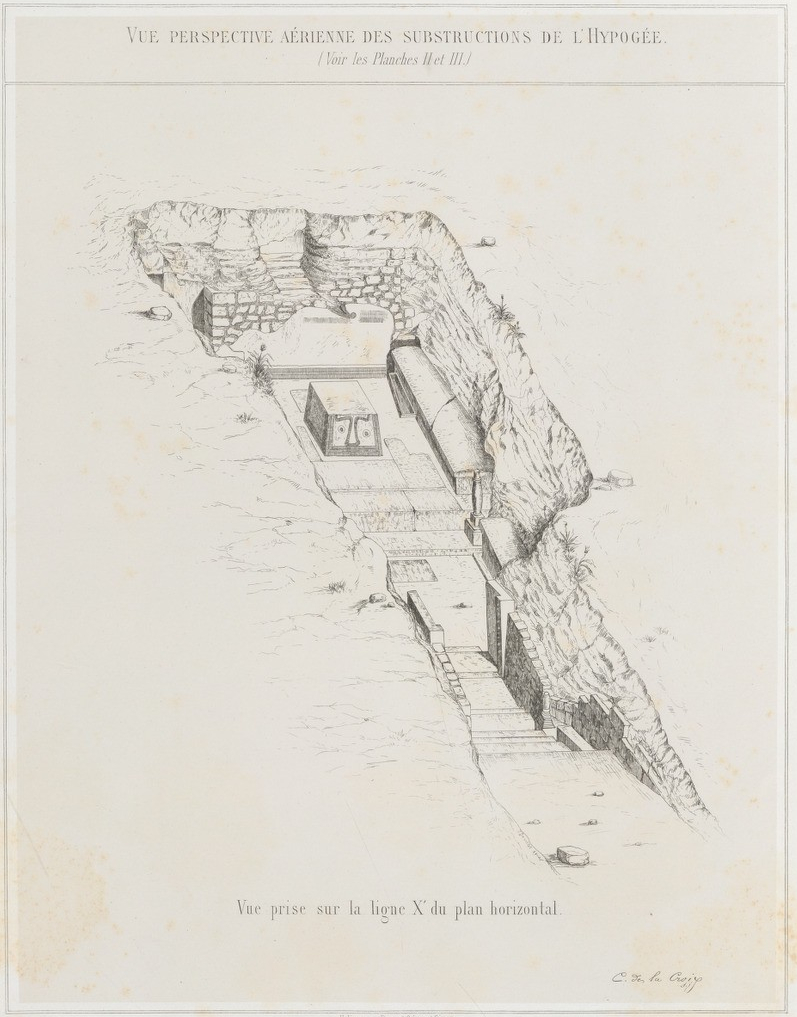
Hypogeum of the Dunes.

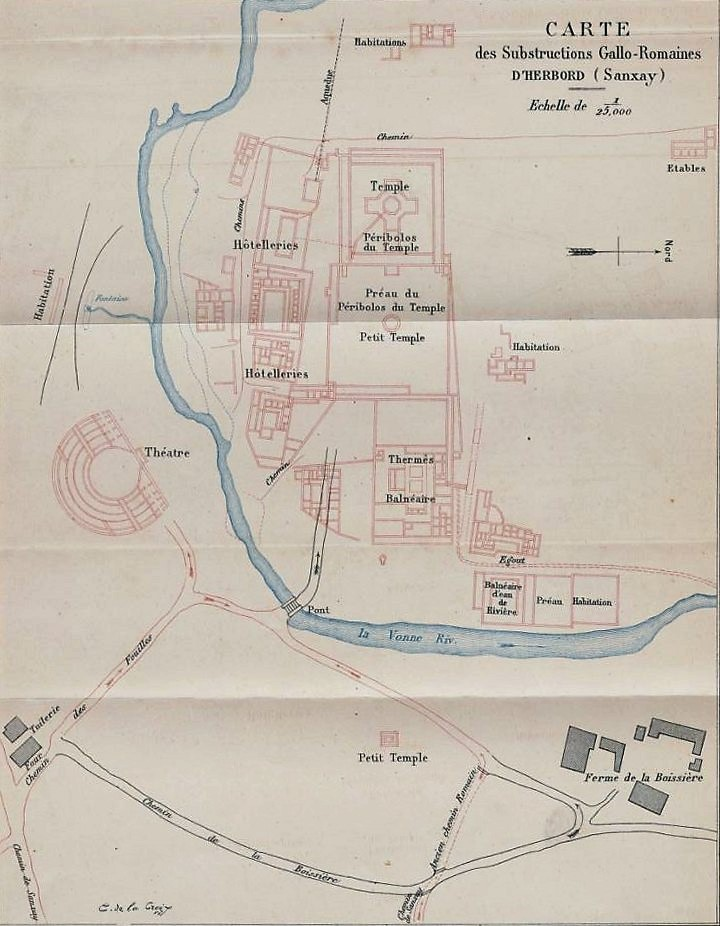
Vestiges of Sanxay.

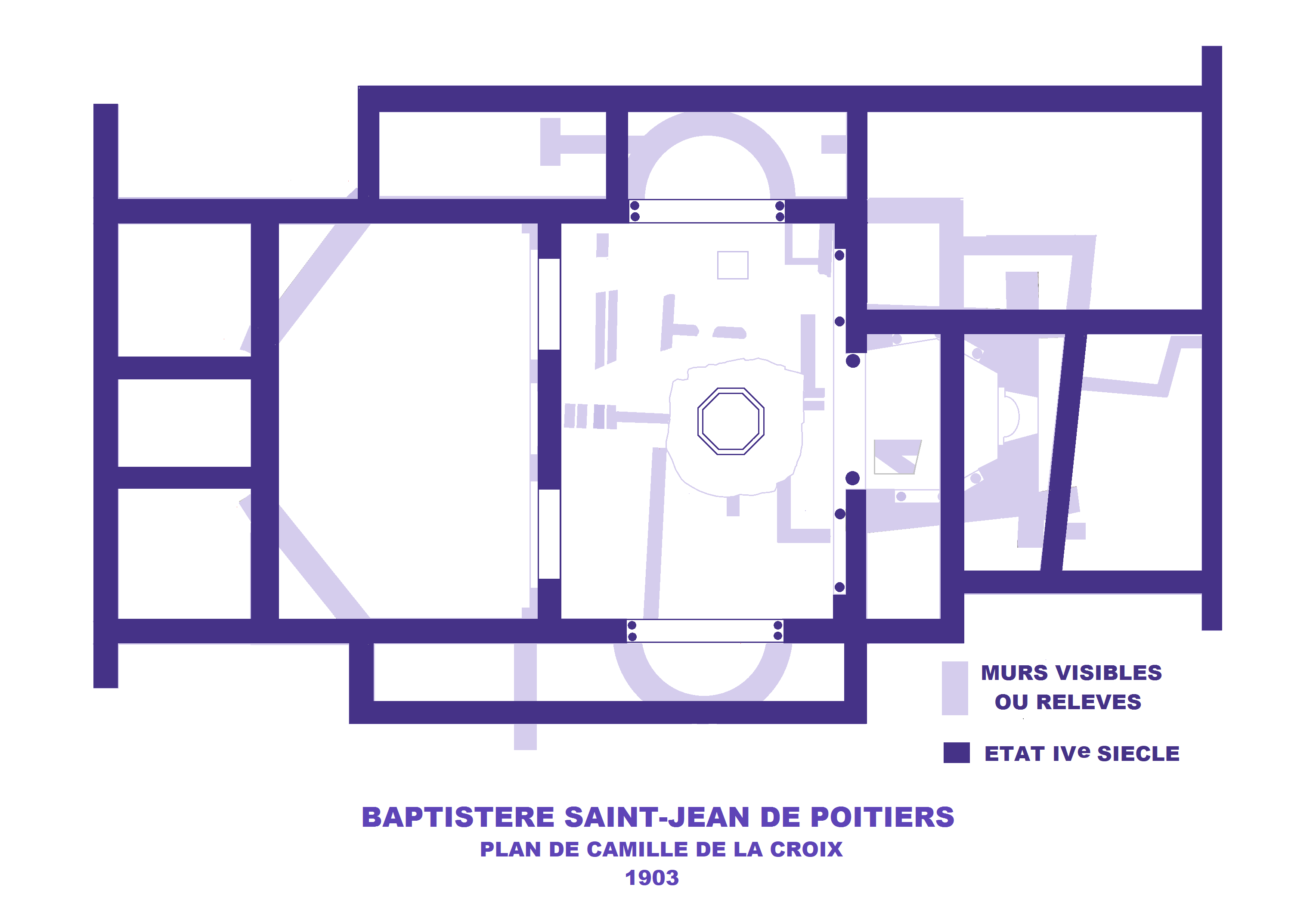
Baptistry of Poitiers in the 4th century.

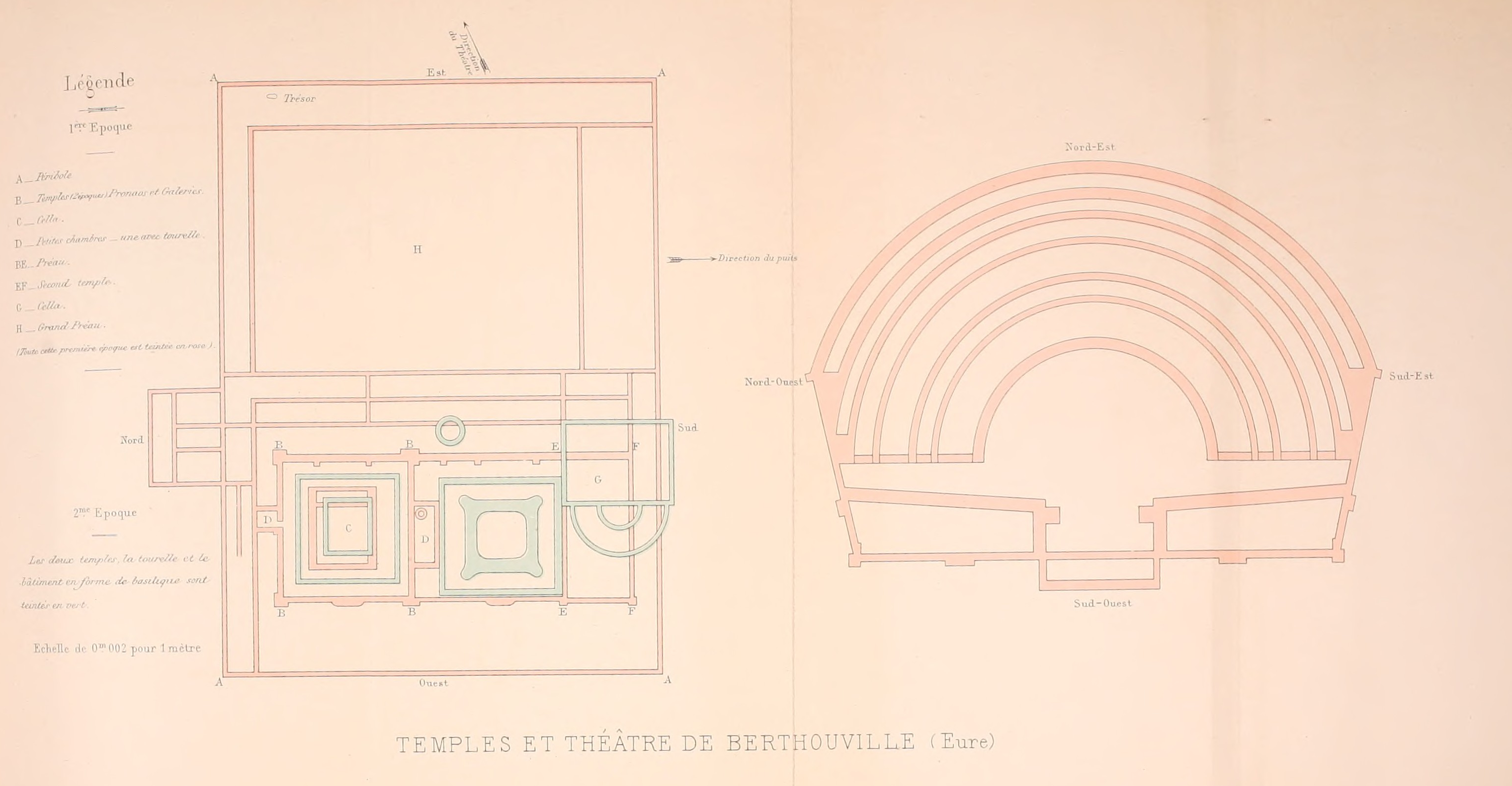
Vestiges of Berthouville.

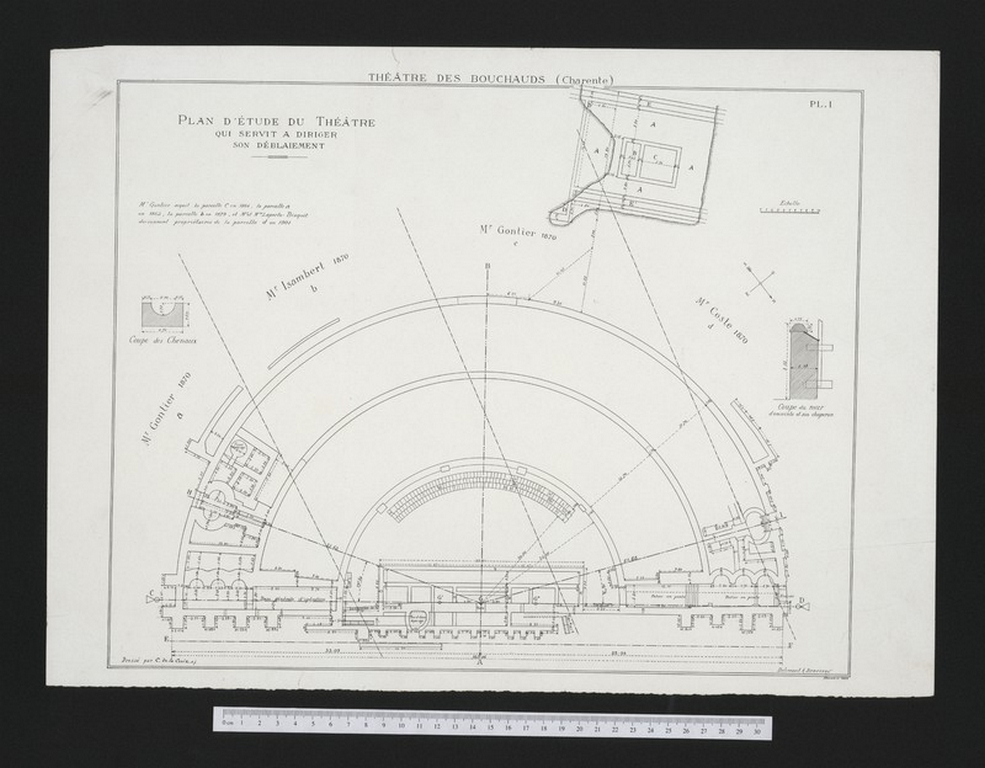
Bouchauds theater.

=== Camille de La Croix and learned societies ===
On November 15, 1877, Father de La Croix became a member of the Société des Antiquaires de l'Ouest (SAO). In 1881, he was appointed treasurer, a role which entailed the management of the society's properties. He concurrently held the position of curator of collections, a post he retained until his death. The photographer Jules Robuchon, also a member of the society, produced a substantial body of photographic work at the excavation sites, which was subsequently used to illustrate Camille de La Croix's publications.

He commenced his tenure as a correspondent for the Ministry of Public Instruction and Fine Arts in 1886. In 1897, he was designated a "non-resident member" of the Committee for Historic and Scientific Works. However, following a campaign in which his characteristics, status as a Jesuit, and his Belgian nationality were subjected to greater scrutiny than the merits of his work, he was removed from this organization in May 1902.

The relationships between Camille de La Croix and learned societies were, at times, fraught with difficulty and conflict. This is demonstrated by interactions with the Société Archéologique de Touraine, as evidenced by exchanged memoranda, regarding the pillar of Yzeures-sur-Creuse, or the contentious controversy that opposed him to Léon Maître, president of the Société Archéologique de Nantes et de la Loire-Inférieure, concerning the excavations at the Saint-Philbert-de-Grand-Lieu Abbey. Nevertheless, other archaeologists, such as Émile Espérandieu and Jules Quicherat, enjoyed excellent relations with de La Croix, with whom they corresponded regularly.

== Publications ==
This section provides a representative sample of Camille de La Croix's extensive bibliography on his most significant archaeological excavations. For a more exhaustive list, the reader is directed to the website of the Bibliothèque nationale de France.

- Découverte des thermes romains de Poitiers (in French). Tours: Paul Bousrez. 1878. Archived from the original on January 15, 2025.
- Monographie de l'hypogée-martyrium de Poitiers (in French). Paris: Firmin Didot. 1883. Archived from the original on December 7, 2024.
- Mémoire archéologique sur les découvertes d'Herbord, dites de Sanxay (in French). Niort: Clouzot. 1883. Archived from the original on October 7, 2024.
- Mémoire adressé à deux sections du ministère de l'Instruction publique et des Beaux-Arts : Comité des travaux historiques (section d'archéologie) et commission des monuments historiques (8 mai 1896) (in French). Poitiers: Imprimerie Blais et Roy. 1896.
- Le Trésor et les substructions gallo-romaines de Berthouville (extrait du Bulletin archéologique) (in French). Paris: IN Group. 1897.
- Étude sommaire du baptistère Saint-Jean de Poitiers : deuxième édition revue et augmentée (in French). Poitiers: Imprimerie Blais et Roy. 1904.
- Étude sur l'ancienne église de Saint-Philibert-de-Grand-Lieu (Loire-Inférieure), d'après des fouilles, des sondages et des chartes (extrait des mémoires de la SAO) (in French). Poitiers: Imprimerie Blais et Roy. 1906.
- Le Théâtre gallo-romain des Bouchauds et son déblaiement (in French). Poitiers: Impr. Richer. 1908.

== See also ==
- List of archaeologists
- List of historians

== Bibliography ==
- Boissavit-Camus, Brigitte; Rérolle, Michel (1989). Romains et Barbares entre Loire et Gironde, IVe – Xe siècles : Catalogue d'exposition, Poitiers, musée Sainte-Croix, 6 octobre 1989 – 28 février 1990 (in French). Poitiers: Musée Sainte-Croix.
- Boully, Vincent (2013). "Fonds du R. P. Camille de La Croix (1831–1911) : notice descriptive". Le site des archives départementales des Deux-Sèvres et de la Vienne (in French). Archived from the original on December 22, 2022.
- Delcourt-Vlaeminck, Marianne; Simon-Hiernard, Dominique (2016). Le Révérend Père Camille de La Croix, un Tournaisien archéologue en Poitou : Catalogue d'exposition, Musée d'Archéologie de la Ville de Tournai (Belgique) (in French). Tournai.
- Eygun, François (1965). Art des pays d'Ouest (in French). Paris: Arthaud.
- Guillouët, Jean-Marie; Faucherre, Nicolas (2011). "Des archéologues au service de la foi ? Le père de la Croix à Saint-Philbert-de-Grand-Lieu et le chanoine Durville à Nantes". Annales de Bretagne et des pays de l'Ouest (in French). CXVIII (3 « La naissance de l’archéologie régionale dans l’Ouest armoricain »): 323–333. doi:10.4000/abpo.2071.
- Hiernard, Jean (2004). Le Baptistère Saint-Jean de Poitiers (in French). Poitiers: Société des Antiquaires de l'Ouest.
- Pillard, Guy (1982). Les ruines d'Herbord : commune de Sanxay (in French). Niort: Éditions du Terroir.
