= Gallo-Roman site of Sanxay =

Structures in Vienne, France

Ancient site of Sanxay
- Gallo-Roman ruins at Herbord
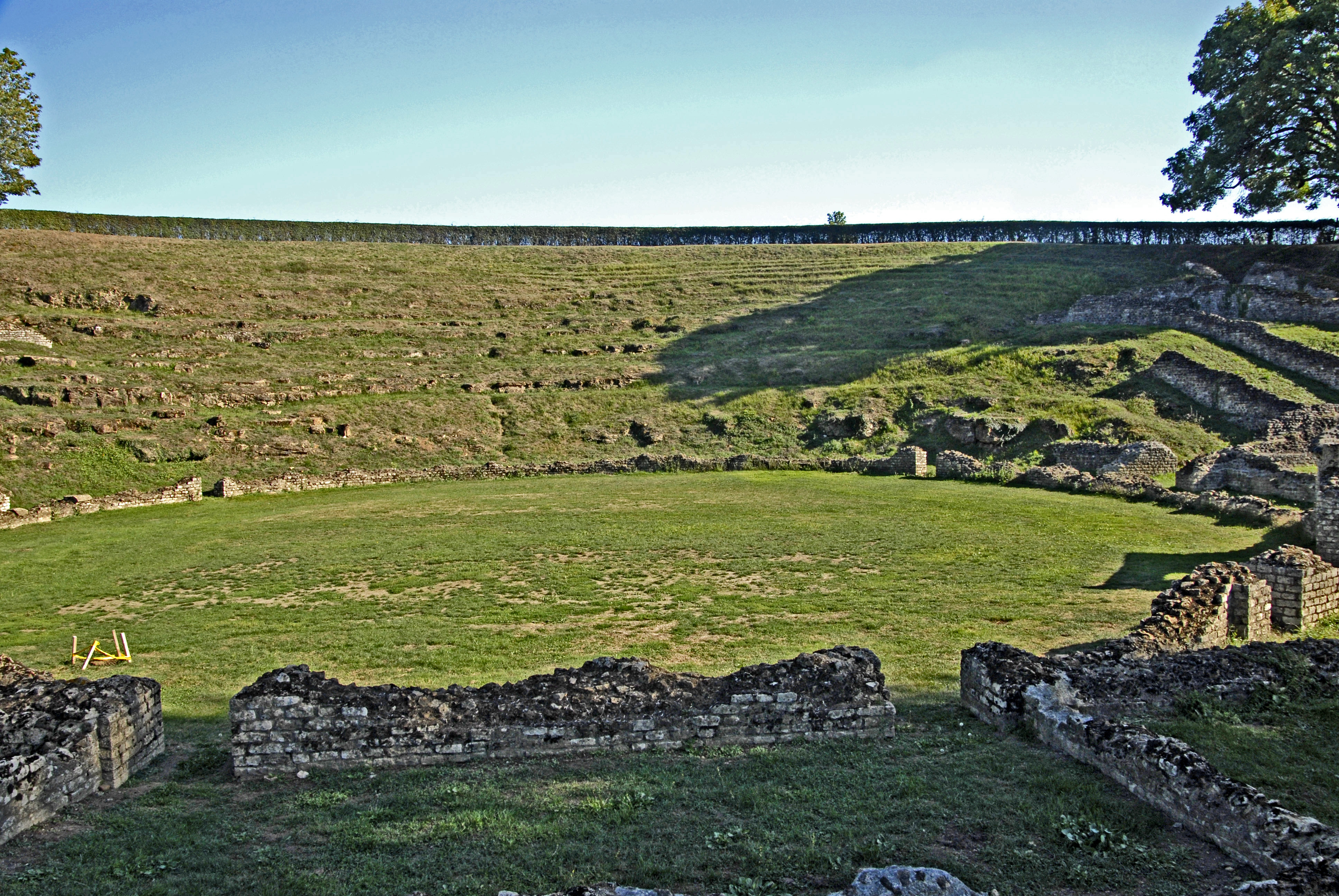
- Gallo-Roman amphitheatre

- Location within Rome
- 46°29′42″N 0°01′19″W
- Type: Rural sanctuary
- Periods: Ancient history (Roman Empire 1st and 2nd centuries)
- Location: Gallia Aquitania, Roman Empire
- Region: Sanxay, Vienne, Nouvelle-Aquitaine

Site notes
- Elevation: 123–138 m (404–453 ft)
- Area: 20 ha (49 acres)
- Condition: MH listed (1882, enclosure, portico, theater and thermal baths).
- Website: www.sanxay.fr

The ancient site of Sanxay is a location comprising several constructions dating back to the 1st and 2nd centuries. It is situated in the commune of Sanxay, department of Vienne, France.

At the beginning of the 21st century, the site is presented as a large rural sanctuary related to the cult of healing waters. It is centered around an uncommon octagonal temple plan, a Gallo-Roman amphitheater, and therapeutic baths. Additionally, some buildings were likely intended to accommodate visitors seeking cures. The site is considerably larger than the visible remains indicate, with an original span of at least twenty hectares. It was excavated between 1881 and 1883 by Father Camille de La Croix, but the excavated area was subsequently backfilled. Only the temple, the amphitheater, and the water sanctuary, classified as historic monuments in 1882, remain visible.

== Location ==
The site's remaining structures are situated in an area known as Les Craches, a small hamlet within the larger Herbord community, located in the western portion of the Sanxay commune, situated near the border of the Deux-Sèvres department. The Vonne River, a tributary of the Clain, traverses the site. Most ancient structures are situated in a bend of the river on the left bank, with the amphitheater and a small temple on the right bank. Based on current knowledge, the remains span approximately 20 hectares. (Note: Aupert, Hiernard & Fincker 2008, p. 9, Histoire des recherches archéologiques)

== Description ==
=== Temple ===
Restitution of the temple.

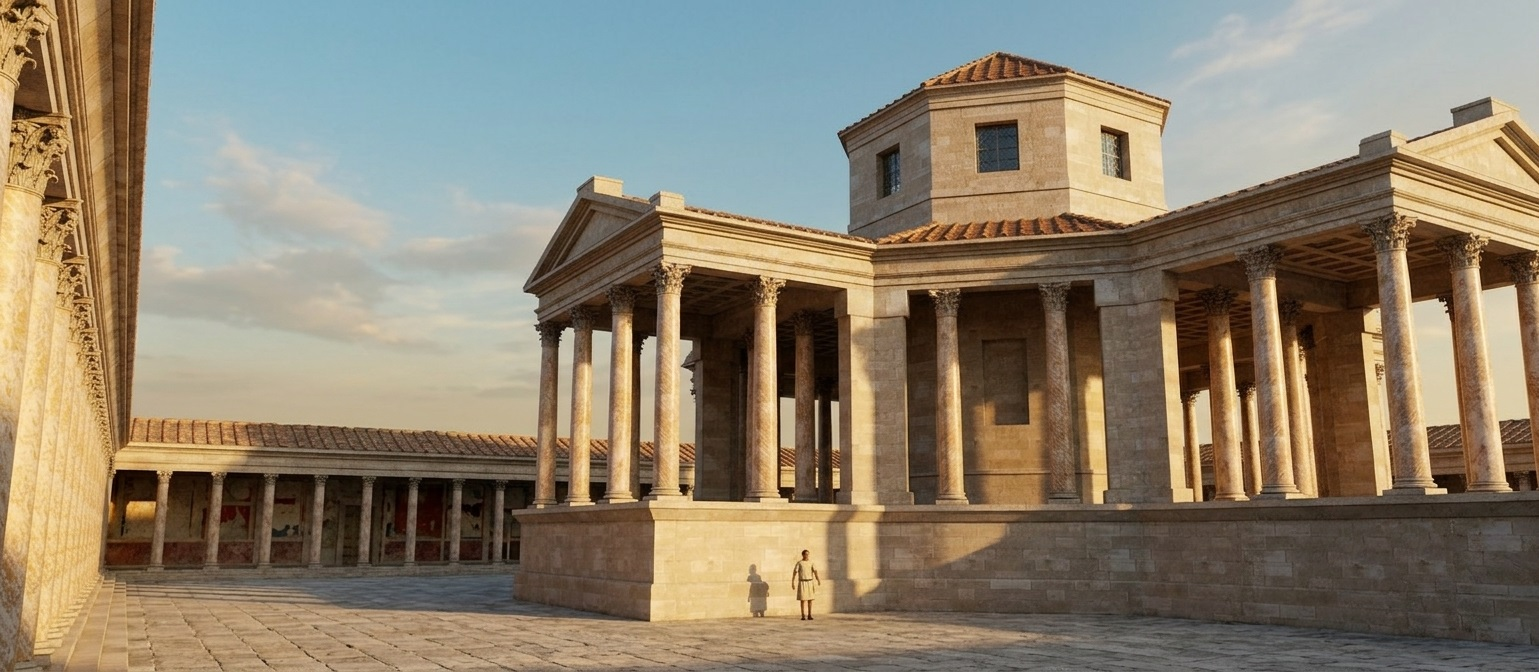
View of the Sanxay temple from the portico.

The temple at Sanxay is distinguished by an original design, featuring an octagonal cella (the innermost chamber), a layout that is occasionally observed in Gaul. (Note: Aupert, Hiernard & Fincker 2008, p. 70, Le temple octogonal) The structure was possibly encircled by a dome measuring approximately 13 meters in width. A spring originates from the southeast foundation of the cella, with its foundations composed of large, non-joined blocks designed to facilitate the capture of water. (Note: Aupert, Hiernard & Fincker 2008, p. 82, Le temple octogonal) In contrast to the typical mirroring of shapes, the peripheral portico forms a Greek cross, with each branch exceeding 10 meters in width. The eastern branch connects the entrance of the cella with the peribolos (temple courtyard). A colonnade approximately 8 meters in height, supported by the portico wall, upholds the dual-pitched roofs of each branch. Based on comparisons with other temples in Gaul, the total height could have been as much as 23 meters. (Note: Aupert, Hiernard & Fincker 2008, p. 83, Le temple octogonal)

A series of four porticoes delineates a roughly square peribolos measuring 79 meters by 76 meters, encompassing an area of approximately 4,000 m^{2}. The floors of the four porticoes and the temple’s gallery are situated at an elevation of approximately one meter above the courtyard. The eastern section of the enclosure, equipped with three staircases, provides access to the two side galleries and a porch leading to the esplanade of the cella. The western gallery appears to be enclosed by a wall, both externally and courtyard-side, accessible via the northern portico and by a door that opens directly to the exterior. The northern and southern porticoes are likely open to the courtyard with a colonnade similar to that of the temple gallery. (Note: Aupert, Hiernard & Fincker 2008, pp. 78–81, Le temple octogonal)

A subterranean passageway runs diagonally from the temple to the southeastern corner of the peribolos and extends outward to a basin. It is probable that this served as a drainage system for the cella and temple gallery. (Note: Aupert, Hiernard & Fincker 2008, p. 85, Le temple octogonal)

=== Theater ===
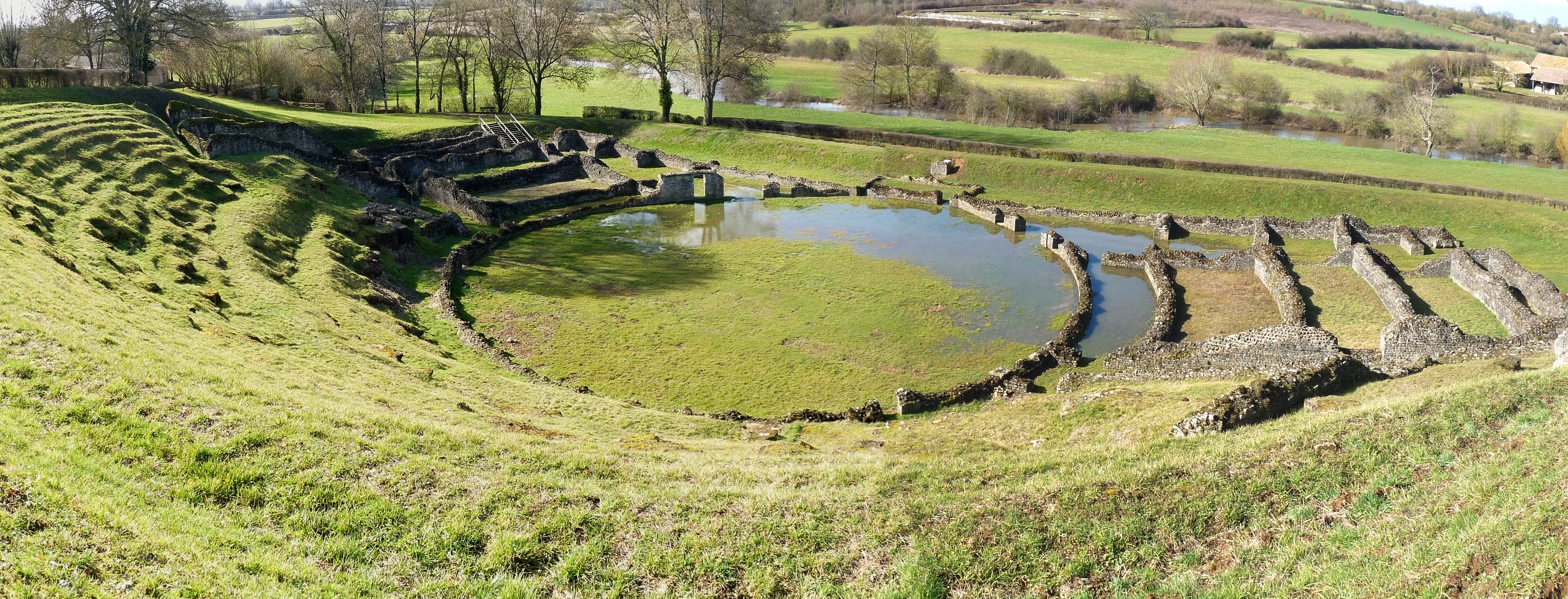
The theater, looking towards the Vonne River in the background.

In contrast to the majority of the site's buildings, the theater is situated on the more precipitous right bank of the Vonne River. This positioning strategy reduced the amount of masonry work required during construction by capitalizing on the natural slope for the cavea (seating area). The theater is shaped like an oversized semicircle, with an 89-meter width that allows for the accommodation of nearly 6,600 spectators. The theater’s walls supported wooden bleachers, but a small masonry loge d'honneur (honor box), which has since disappeared, likely existed. The cavea overlooks a circular orchestra (performance area) about 20 meters in diameter, with a small stage opposite the orchestra. (Note: Aupert, Hiernard & Fincker 2008, pp. 40–44, Le théâtre)

The Sanxay theater's semi-circular cavea and circular orchestra align it with the category of "rural" performance venues. Its architectural characteristics bridge the gap between theaters and amphitheaters, (Note: Aupert, Hiernard & Fincker 2008, p. 45, Le théâtre) as exemplified by structures such as Drevant (Cher) or Grand (Vosges) in rural settings and Lutetia in urban areas.

In the course of nineteenth-century excavations, 143 inscription fragments were unearthed. However, more than a hundred of these have been lost, rendering it impossible to reconstruct the texts to which they belonged. Despite being found on the site, there is no evidence that they originated from the theater. Furthermore, the nineteenth-century excavations disrupted the theater's stratigraphy, making it challenging to draw conclusions based on more recent observations.

=== Water sanctuary ===
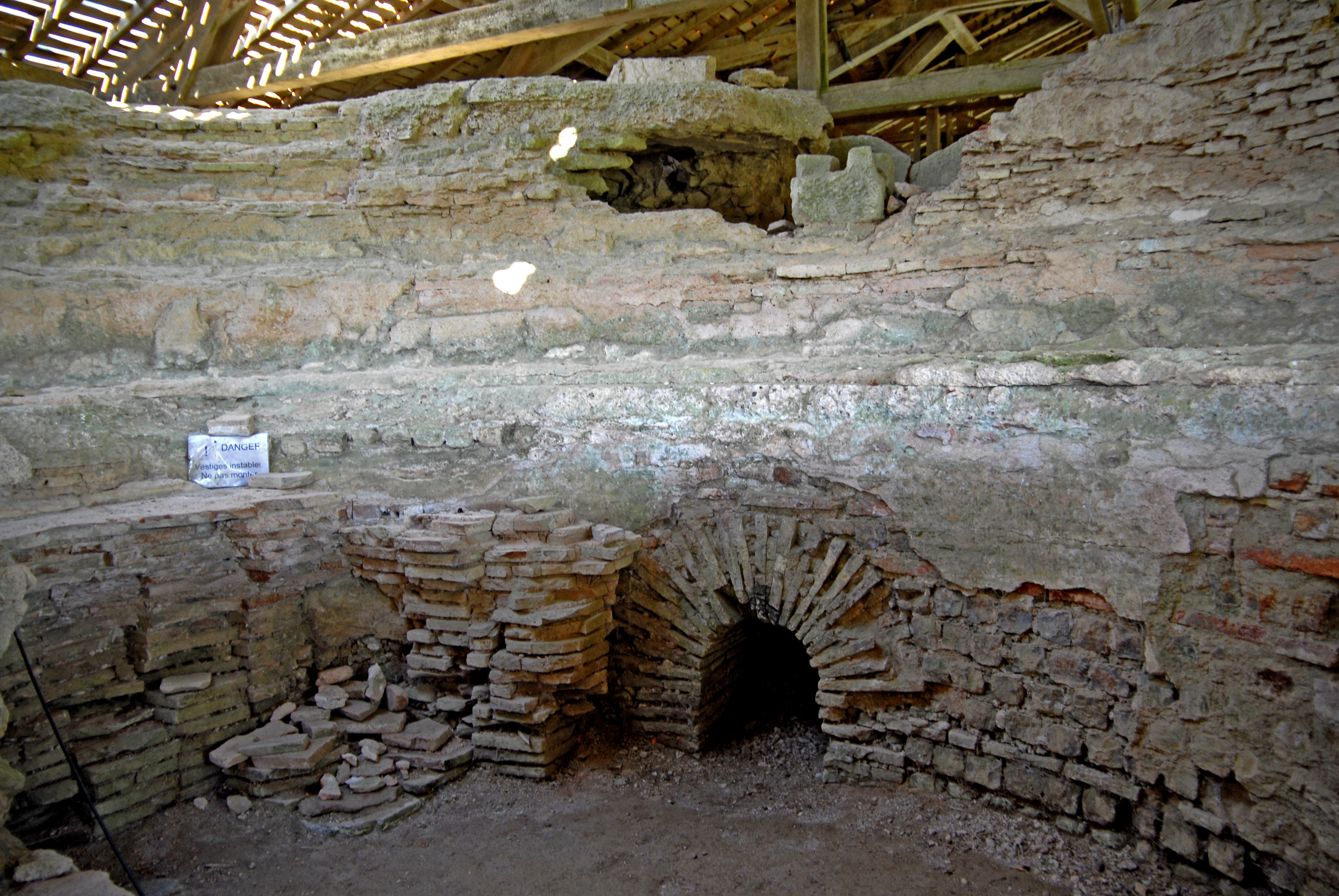
A hot-water pool in the thermal baths (state V and later).

This group of buildings has undergone a series of modifications, with at least eight successive stages identified. The eastern part has been the subject of extensive study, while the western part, which was backfilled, has not been excavated.

The initial phase of investigation reveals the presence of a temple, the sole remaining architectural element of which is the peribolos. This structure originally contained three niches, which may have been utilized for venerating statues. (Note: Aupert, Hiernard & Fincker 2008, pp. 46–47, Le sanctuaire des eaux curatives) The peribolos was subsequently expanded, and a room interpreted as the temple's cella was constructed. (Note: Aupert, Hiernard & Fincker 2008, p. 48, Le sanctuaire des eaux curatives) Two additional cellae were then built nearby (26.60 × 14.80 meters, or a total of 90 × 50 Roman feet), a highly unusual arrangement. The temple's interior developments have been interpreted in various ways, with some scholars suggesting a connection to the cult of healing waters. (Note: Aupert, Hiernard & Fincker 2008, pp. 49–54, Le sanctuaire des eaux curatives)

Sanxay thermal sanctuary (states VI and VII).

The final five phases of modifications demonstrate the evolution of the sanctuary towards a thermal function. In the initial phase (Phase IV), two bath complexes were constructed to the northeast and west of the large temple. These baths were not connected. The absence of certain typical features of Roman baths, such as the frigidarium, which is not present in the northeastern building, indicates that the establishment was not designed to function as a traditional bathhouse. Instead, it was likely constructed to accommodate visitors seeking cures. (Note: Aupert, Hiernard & Fincker 2008, pp. 55–60, Le sanctuaire des eaux curatives) In the 2nd century (Phase V), the thermal complexes underwent further expansion through the conversion of the two former cellae of the temple into hot pools. One of these was circular, while the other was square. These new structures occupied nearly all the available space, creating a challenging environment for visitors to navigate. (Note: Aupert, Hiernard & Fincker 2008, pp. 61–65, Le sanctuaire des eaux curatives) A sixth phase, lacking a date, saw the expansion of the former temple, which had been converted into baths, towards the east. This involved the construction of a new pool and connections to other rooms. Subsequently, the pool was elevated, and additional rooms underwent modification (Phase VII). (Note: Aupert, Hiernard & Fincker 2008, pp. 66–67, Le sanctuaire des eaux curatives) An eighth and final phase, based solely on the 19th-century excavation records, is distinguished by constructing a series of small rooms to the northeast of the site, corresponding to baths with a more "classic" layout. (Note: Aupert, Hiernard & Fincker 2008, pp. 68–69, Le sanctuaire des eaux curatives) From the inception of the site's thermal function, the various additions of rooms were accompanied by the retention of previous arrangements in their original functions.

=== Buried buildings and artifacts ===
In addition to the three groups of structures that remain visible, the excavations conducted between 1881 and 1883 revealed the existence of numerous other buildings across an area of approximately 20 hectares. The aforementioned remains were not entirely obliterated; rather, they were reburied to the conclusion of the excavations, when the land was returned to its original proprietors. The majority of these structures were residential. Some were likely private residences, while the considerable size of several others indicates that they were inns frequented by pilgrims of the temple or visitors seeking cures at the sanctuary. A sizable basin situated to the southeast of the temple and linked to it by an underground conduit may have served a utilitarian function (drainage collection) but also a sacred one. To the east of the octagonal temple's enclosure, a vast esplanade, likely sacred, features a central structure that resembles a tholos. This structure may have served as a tomb. On the right bank of the Vonne River, a small square fanum is situated. The cella of the octagonal temple, the tholos, and the fanum on the right bank are perfectly aligned along an east-west axis. (Note: Aupert, Hiernard & Fincker 2008, pp. 86–87, Les vestiges non visbles) Along the edge of the Vonne, de La Croix identified a building without pools but leading to a riverbank feature. This was interpreted as a bathing area where visitors bathed directly in the river.

During the nineteenth-century excavations, a considerable number of objects were recovered. Regrettably, some of these have been lost, but others have been preserved and are now housed at the Sainte-Croix Museum in Poitiers. Among these objects are Roman coins (dating from the first to the third century), ceramic pottery, jewelry, household items, as well as bronze statues (of Mercury) and terracotta statues (of Venus made in Augustodunum, also known as Autun). (Note: Aupert, Hiernard & Fincker 2008, pp. 92–102, Le musée Sainte-Croix de Poitiers)

== Chronology of the site ==
The Sanxay site appears to have been occupied from the conclusion of the 1st century BCE, as substantiated by the discovery of coins on the premises. During the midpoint of the 1st century CE, the octagonal temple, the initial edifices at the sanctuary, and the inaugural permanent residences were erected. (Note: Aupert, Hiernard & Fincker 2008, p. 20, Les premières occupations)

Sanxay reached its apogee in the 2nd century with the construction of the double cella temple. This was followed by the completion of the octagonal temple and the initial installation of the thermal sanctuary. Further expansion continued until the end of the 2nd century. (Note: Aupert, Hiernard & Fincker 2008, pp. 22–23, Rôle des Pictons et des Romains)

Following this, there is evidence that Sanxay declined, which may have been due to the crisis of the 3rd century or the rise of Christianity. This latter factor is evidenced by the prominence of Hilary of Poitiers and Martin of Tours in the 4th century, which overshadowed paganism. However, no construction is attributed to the 3rd century. (Note: Aupert, Hiernard & Fincker 2008, pp. 24–25, Rôle des Pictons et des Romains)

The visible remains of Sanxay are now accessible to the public, under the supervision of the Centre des Monuments Nationaux.

== Excavations and research ==
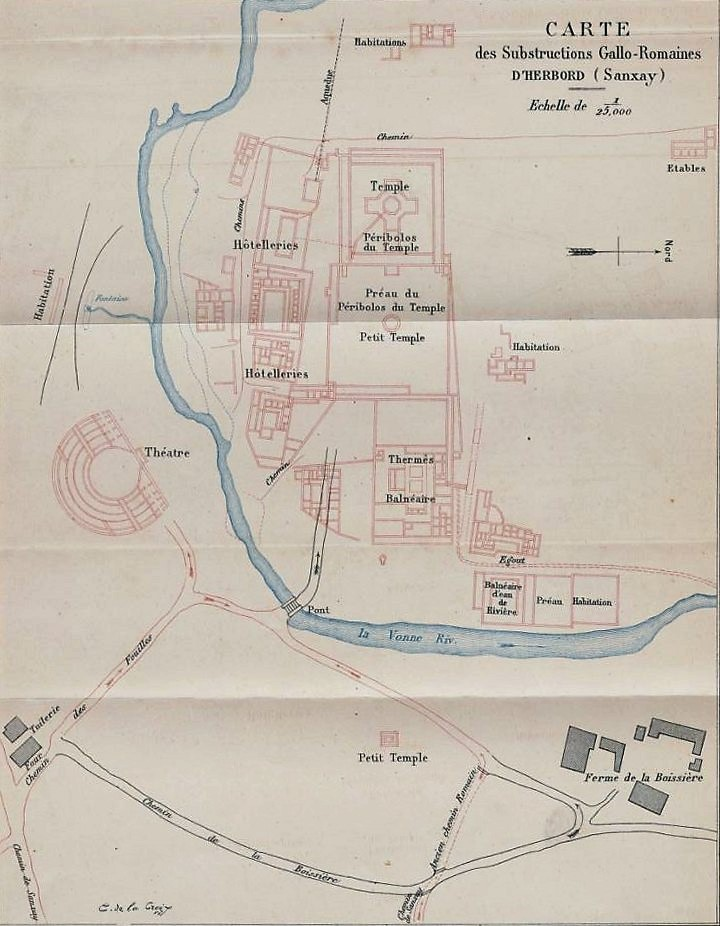
Survey of the remains of Sanxay by Camille de La Croix.

The location of the remains, which had been known for some time, was subsequently used as a stone quarry. However, it was not until 1865 that a commission from the Société des Antiquaires de l'Ouest was tasked with conducting the inaugural surveys of the site.

From February 1881 to October 1883, Jesuit priest Camille de La Croix undertook a comprehensive clearing of the ruins. However, the land, which had been rented solely for the duration of the excavation, had to be backfilled once the excavations were complete. While detailed site plans were drafted, drawings were created, some photographs were taken, and a publication was released, the excavation techniques employed at the time and the dearth of comprehensive written documentation resulted in a substantial and irreparable loss of information. (Note: Aupert, Hiernard & Fincker 2008, pp. 9–11, Histoire des recherches archéologiques) In 1882, several of the remains were designated as historical monuments.

In 1884 and 1885, the State acquired some land, which prompted Jean-Camille Formigé and his son Jules to survey the ruins. Excavations were conducted in the octagonal temple in 1938 and the sanctuary in 1940. In 1975-1976, exploratory digs were conducted in the sanctuary of waters, previously considered a typical thermal establishment. (Note: Aupert, Hiernard & Fincker 2008, p. 14, Histoire des recherches archéologiques)

From 1985 to 1994, as part of the site's enhancement under the direction of Pierre Aupert, archaeological excavations were conducted in the sanctuary, the temple, and the theater. Additionally, surveys were conducted on the buried remains from 1883. The results of this work, which led to a reevaluation of the function of the "thermae," were published extensively, including in the comprehensive work Sanxay Antique. Beginning in 1998, the three visible complexes—the theater, the temple, and the sanctuary—were the subject of precise surveys and new studies. (Note: Aupert, Hiernard & Fincker 2008, p. 15, Histoire des recherches archéologiques)

== Bibliography ==
- Aupert, Pierre; Hiernard, Jean; Fincker, Myriam (2008). Sanxay antique (in French). Paris: Éditions du patrimoine, centre des monuments nationaux. ISBN 978-2-85822-980-2.
- Blanchet, François (2009). "Sanxay". ADLFI. Archéologie de la France - Informations (in French). doi:10.4000/adlfi.3166. Archived from the original on December 4, 2020.
- de La Croix, Camille (1883). Mémoire archéologique sur les découvertes d'Herbord, dites de Sanxay (in French). Niort: Clouzot. Archived from the original on December 24, 2022.
- Formigé, Jules (1944). "Le sanctuaire de Sanxay (Vienne)" (PDF). Gallia (in French). 2 (1): 43–120. doi:10.3406/galia.1944.1986.
- Montigny, Adrien (2009). "Sanxay". ADLFI. Archéologie de la France - Informations (in French). doi:10.4000/adlfi.3270. Archived from the original on September 7, 2024.
- Pillard, Guy (1982). Les ruines d'Herbord : commune de Sanxay (in French). Niort: Les éditions du terroir.
