= Berthouville Treasure =

Hoard of Roman silver

Coordinates: 49°10′24″N 0°37′17″E

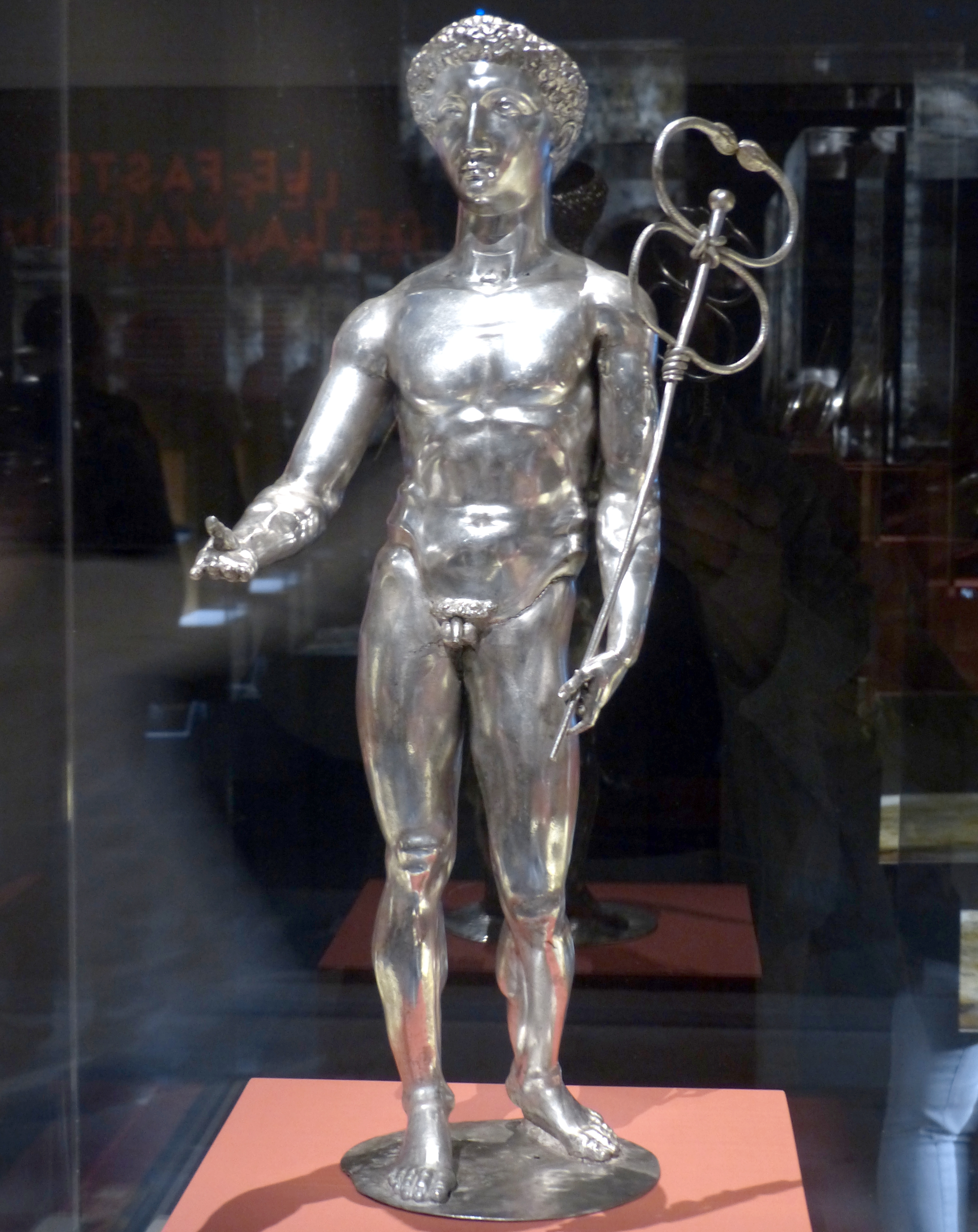
- Silver figure of the Roman god Mercury
- Material: Silver
- Weight: Combined 25 kilograms (55 lb)
- Created: 1st-2nd century CE
- Period/culture: Gallo-Roman
- Discovered: 21 March 1830; Berthouville, Normandy, France
- Present location: National Library of France

The Berthouville treasure is a hoard of Roman silver uncovered by ploughing in March 1830 at the hamlet of Villeret in the commune of Berthouville in the Eure département of Normandy, northern France. Purchased at the time of discovery for a modest 15,000 francs, the treasure is conserved in the Cabinet des Médailles at the Bibliothèque nationale de France, Paris.

== Discovery ==
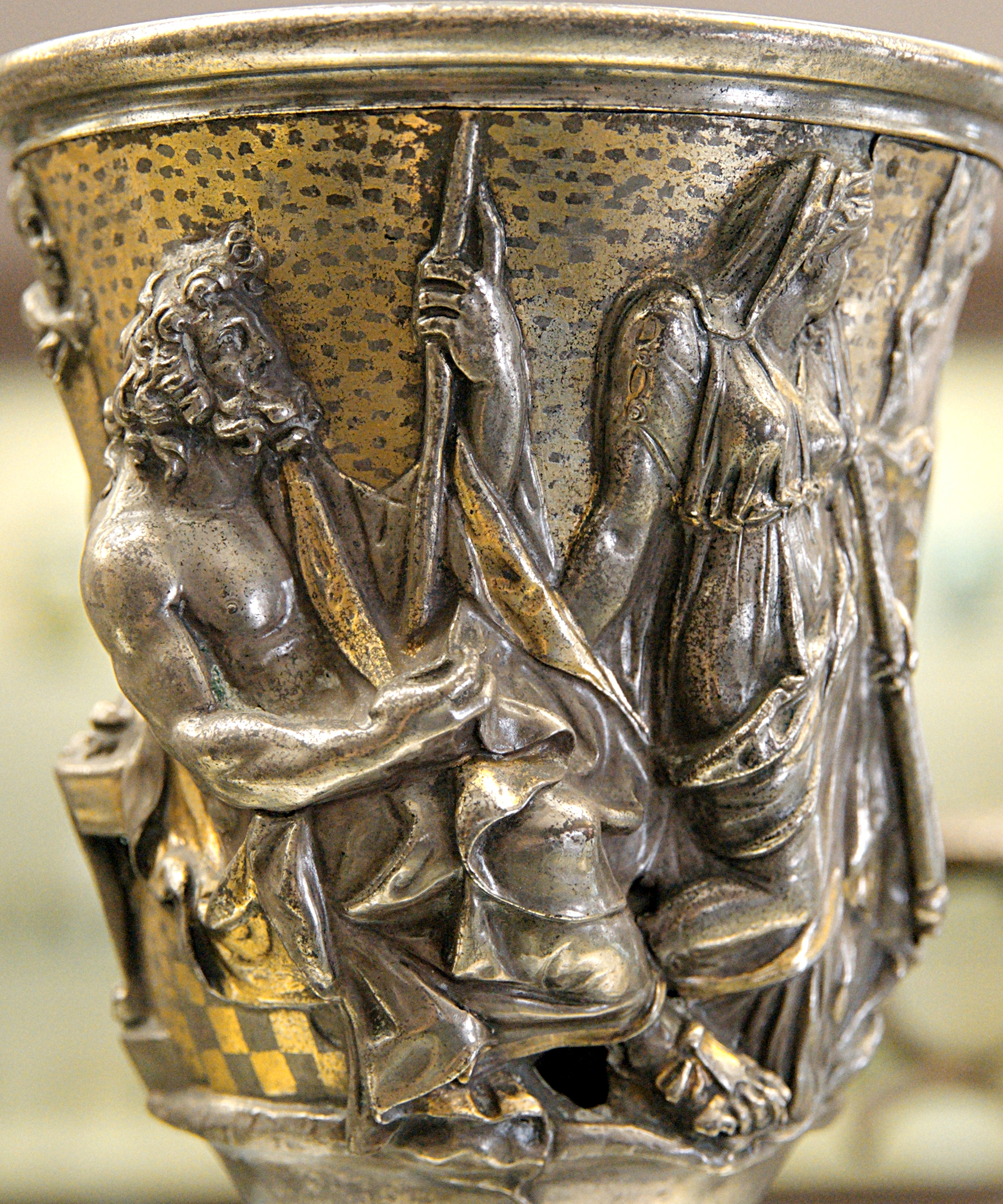
Silver jug made in Italy, with votive inscription from Q. Domitius Tutus to Mercury (mid-1st century CE)

The Berthouville hoard was discovered in early 1830 when farmer Prosper Taurin struck a Roman tile while ploughing his field near the village of Berthouville, in Normandy, France. Once dislodged, the tile uncovered the hastily buried temple treasure a mere 20 centimetres (7.9 in) beneath the modern surface.

The treasure belonged to a sanctuary of Mercury Canetonensis. In the mid-1st century BC, Julius Caesar had identified Mercury as one of the main deities of Gaul. In his Gallo-Roman form Mercury is frequently found with a Gaulish epithet.

The trésor de Berthouville is one of only three known collections of valuable objects definitely associated with a local religious cult in Gaul or Britannia.

== The treasure ==
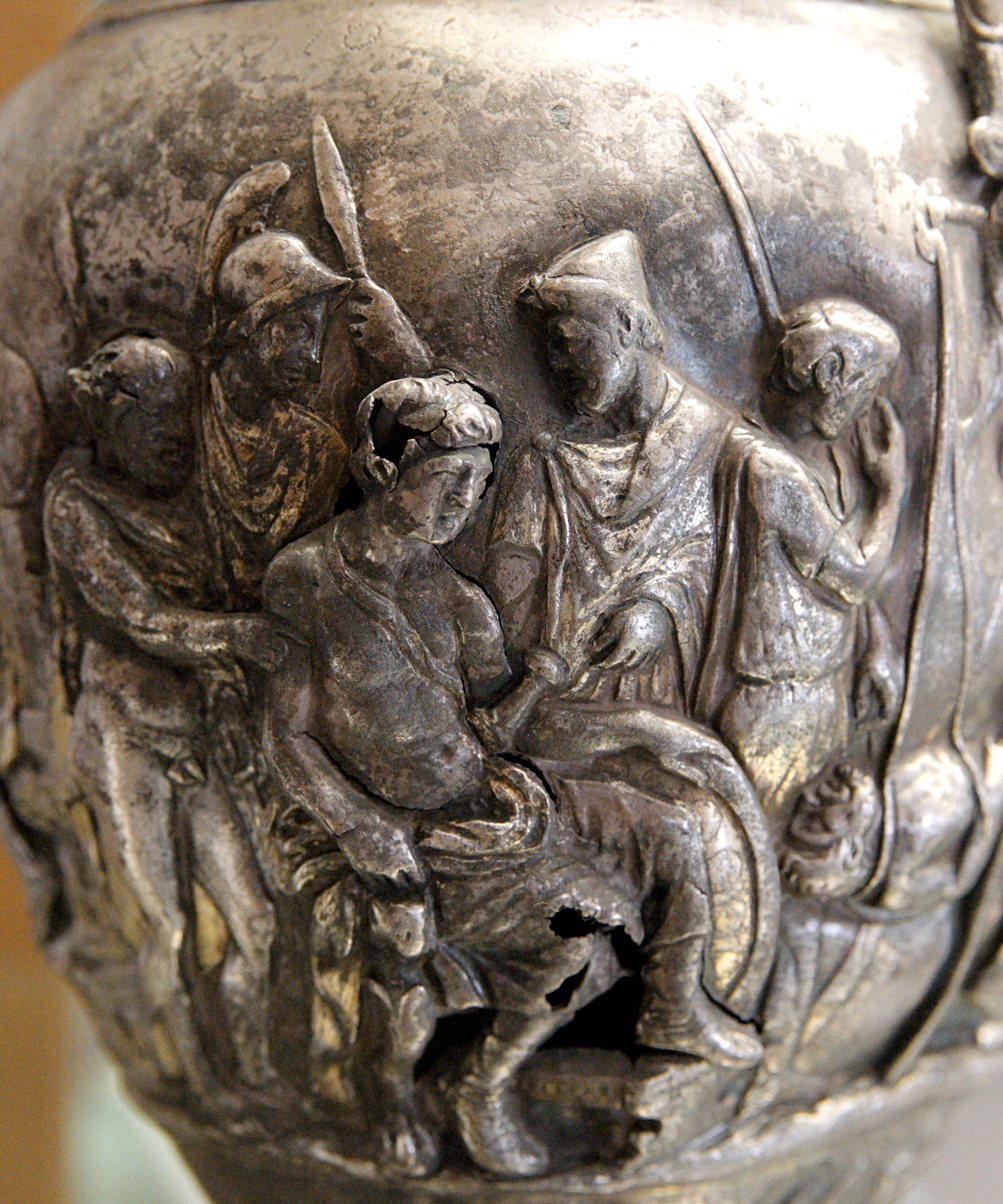
Achilles mourning Patroclus on a silver jug, also from Tutus' votive offering

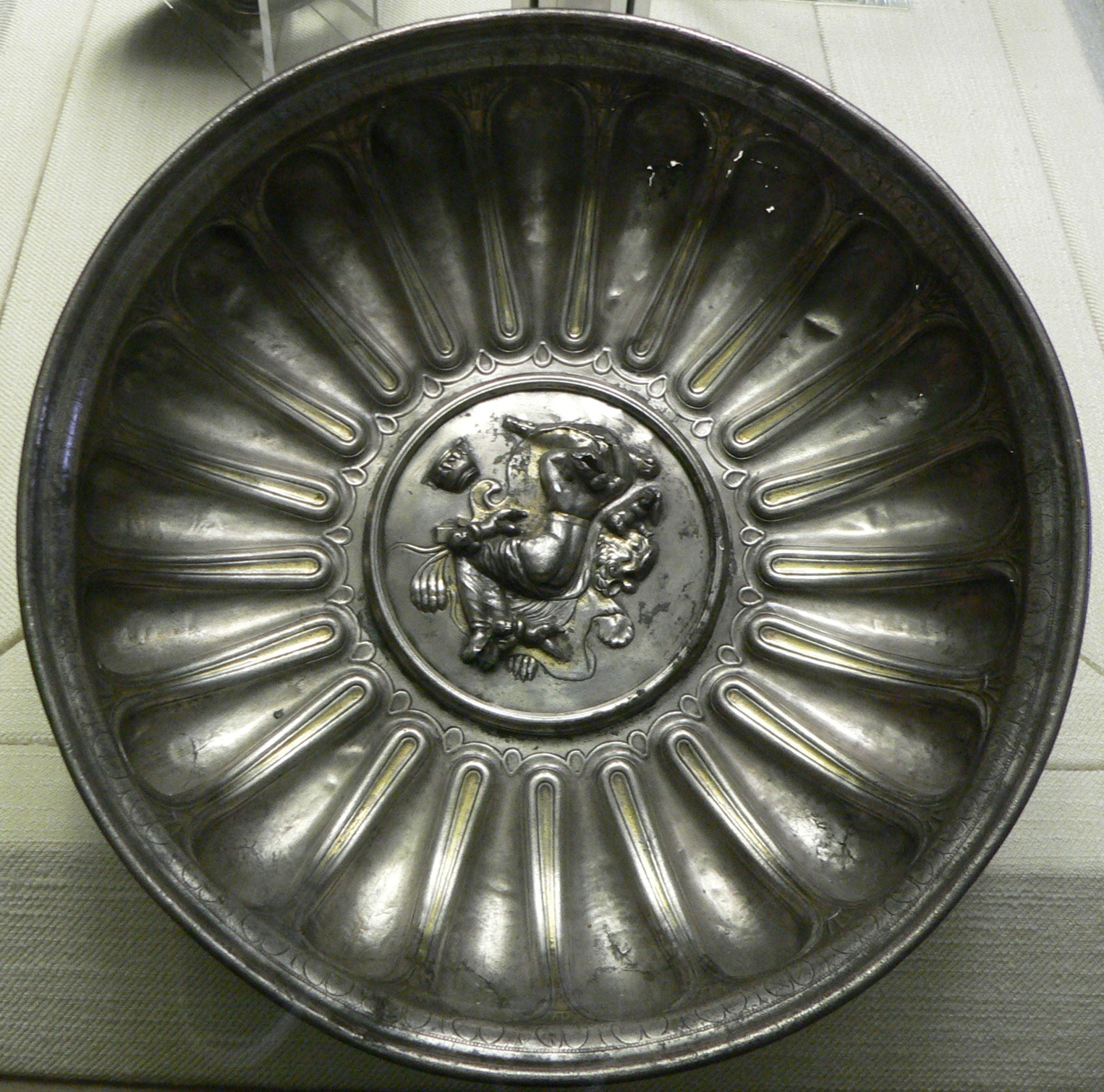
A phiale that was part of Tutus' gift to the shrine of Mercury Canetonensis

The treasure consists of silver and other metalwork, of varying type, quality and dates in the 1st to late 2nd centuries AD. The hoard was hidden in the late 2nd or early 3rd century, but contained heirloom pieces like the repoussé silver jug that was made in Italy in the 1st century AD. The find totalled 93 items, some of which were dissociated handles and silver appliqués, with a total weight of 25 kilograms (55 lb). Most of the items are bowls, cups and jugs, but there is also a phiale for libations.

There are also two silver statuettes of Mercury (the larger 60 centimetres [24 in] tall) and a silver bust of a goddess, probably his mother Maia, perhaps representing Romanized versions of Gallic deities. The pairing of a Roman god with a Gallic goddess would be characteristic of Gallo-Roman religion.

Four of the bowls have incised emblematic designs associated with Mercury, and the formulaic Latin initialism VSLM, standing for votum solvit libens merito ("He fulfils his vow freely, as is deserved"). Nine of the vessels form a group of luxury domestic silver of 1st century date with iconographic connections to Dionysus rather than to Mercury, marked as votive offerings (vota) of one Q. Domitius Tutus; they include a matching pair of silver drinking cups (scyphi) with Dionysiac imagery of centaurs, and a pair of silver wine-jugs.

Excavations near the find-spot in 1861-1862 and 1986 revealed a Gallo-Roman theatre and a shrine that may have been the shrine to which the silver objects had been dedicated.

== Conservation ==
The Berthouville treasure left France for the first time to be studied and conserved at the J. Paul Getty Museum in Malibu, California, as part of collaborative multi-year conservation project between the Getty and the Cabinet des Médailles. Study of the objects revealed previously obscured fine details on the works, and increased understanding of the interaction between Roman and Gallic cultures in what is now northern France.

The restored treasure was exhibited at the Getty Villa from November 2014 to August 2015, then went on tour in the US and Europe before being returned to Paris.
