= Hypogée des Dunes =

Coordinates: 46°34′31″N 0°21′33″E

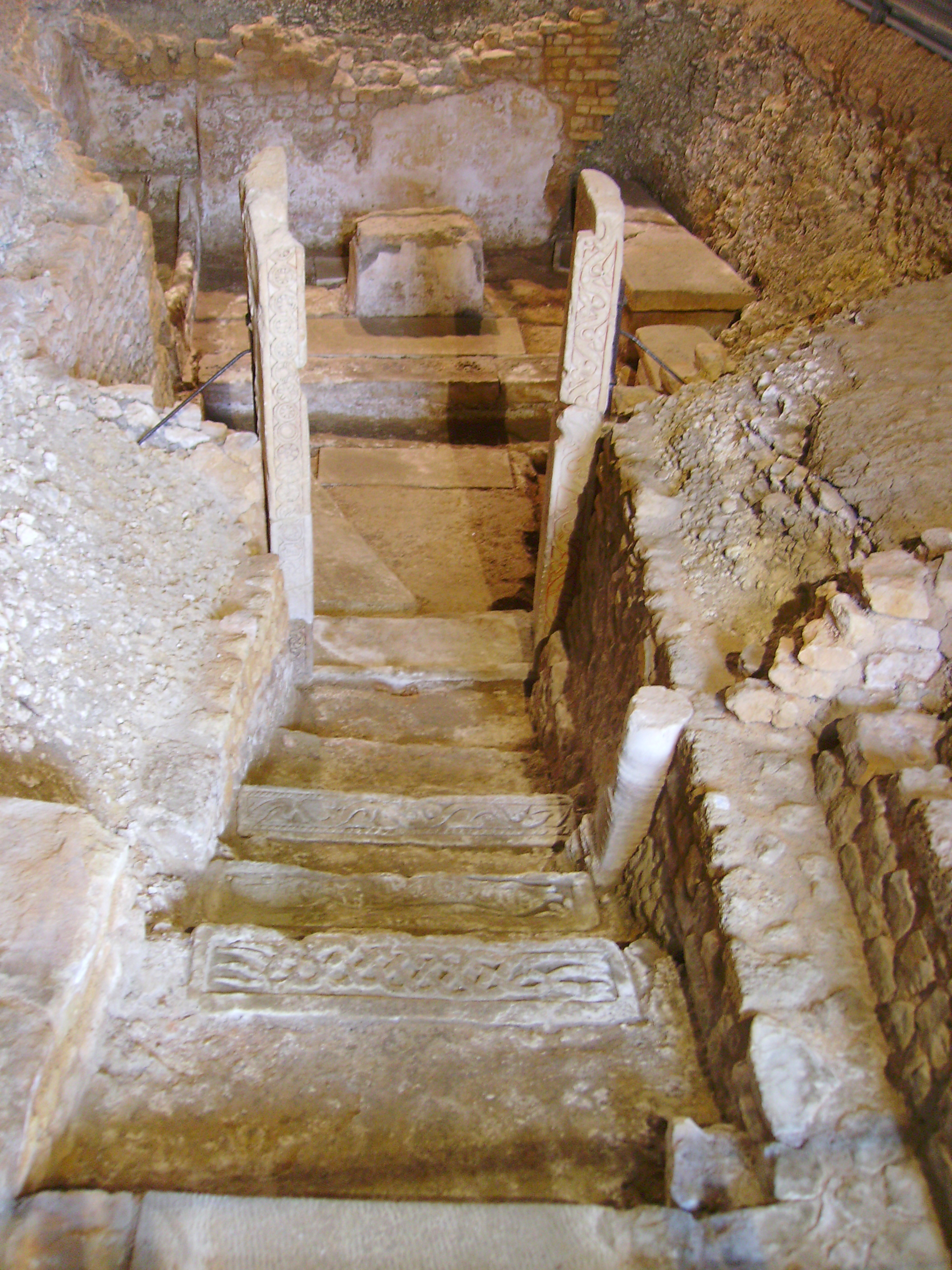
Hypogée des Dunes

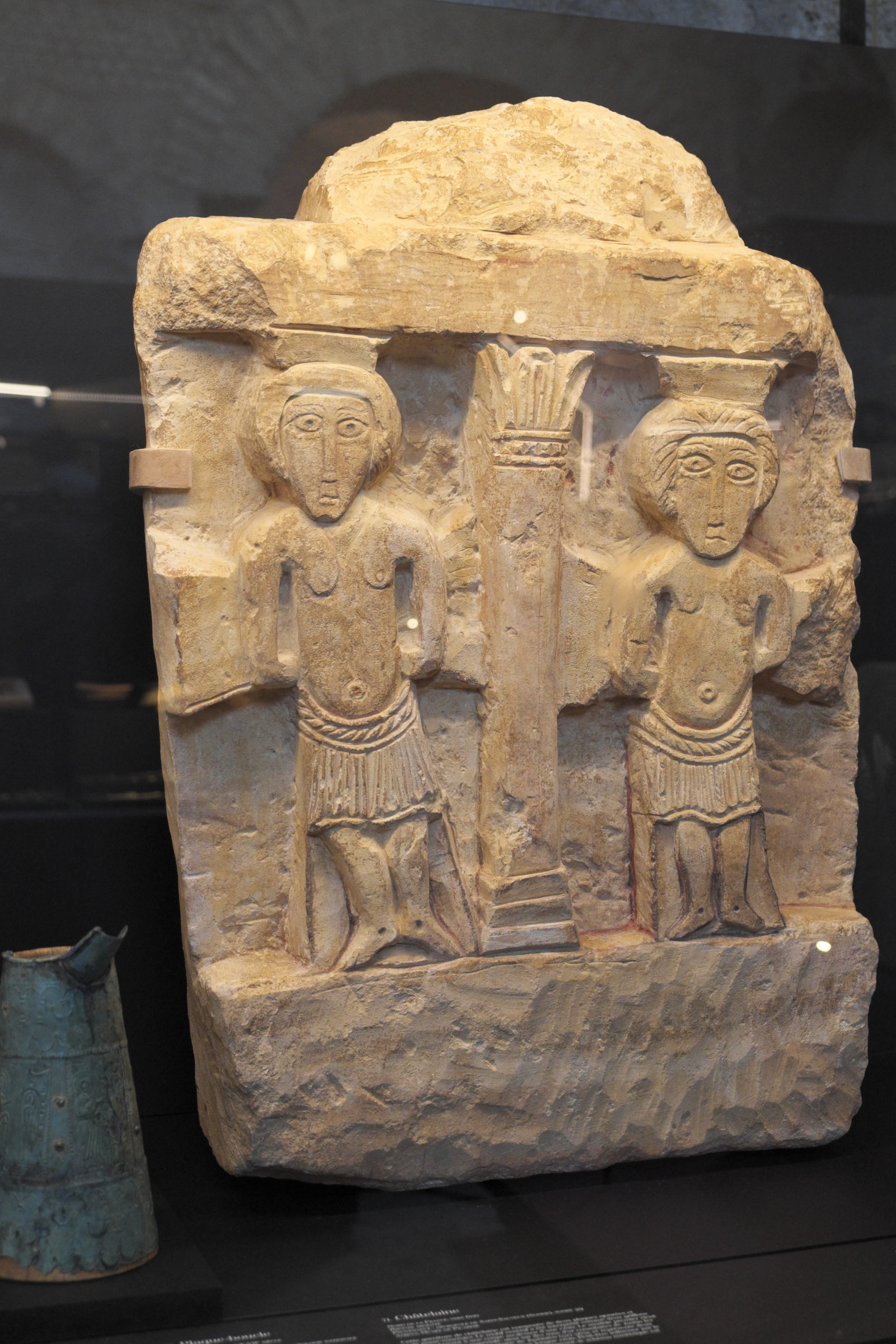
A crucifixion scene in relief.

L'Hypogée des Dunes is an underground chapel (Hypogeum) in Poitiers, France. The chapel is one of the few surviving structures from Merovingian times.

The chapel has a tomb containing approximately 35 burials.

== See also ==
- Camille de La Croix
