= Sanxay =

- Commune
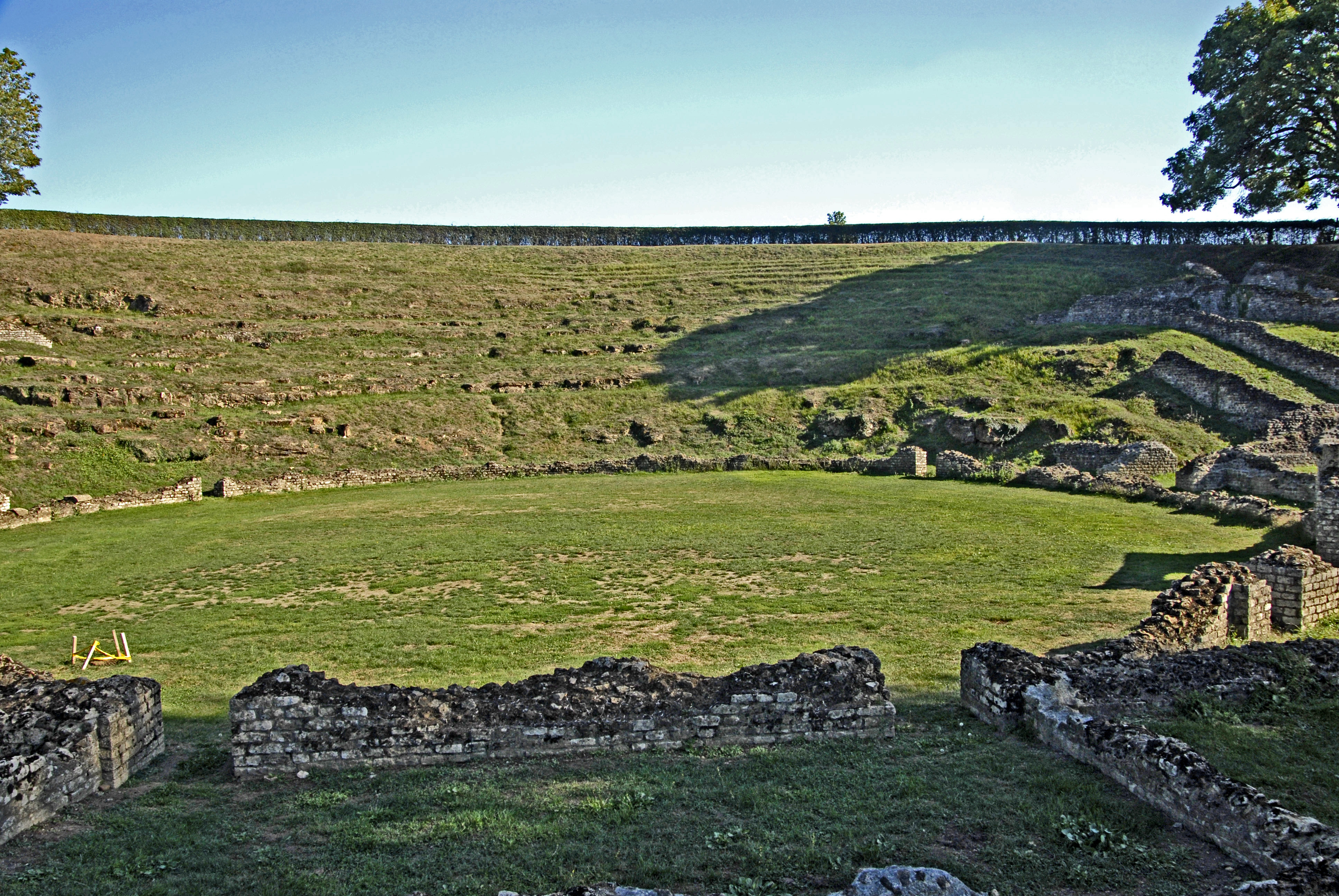
- Gallo-Roman theatre
- Location of Sanxay
- Location within France Location within Nouvelle-Aquitaine
- Coordinates: 46°29′43″N 0°00′21″W
- Country: France
- Region: Nouvelle-Aquitaine
- Department: Vienne
- Arrondissement: Poitiers
- Canton: Lusignan
- Intercommunality: CU Grand Poitiers

Government
  - Mayor (2020–2026): Catherine Forestier
- Area^{1}: 24.13 km^{2} (9.32 sq mi)
- Elevation: 117 m (384 ft)
- Highest elevation: 176 m (577 ft)
- Lowest elevation: 117 m (384 ft)
- Population (2023): 548
  - Density: 22.7/km^{2} (58.8/sq mi)
- Time zone: UTC+01:00 (CET)
  - Summer (DST): UTC+02:00 (CEST)
- INSEE/Postal code: 86253 /86600
- ^{1} French Land Register data, which excludes lakes, ponds, glaciers > 1 km^{2} (0.386 sq mi or 247 acres) and river estuaries.

Sanxay (French pronunciation: [sɑ̃sɛ]) is a commune in the Vienne department in the Nouvelle-Aquitaine region in western France. The population of Sanxay - as of 2017 - was 548.

== See also ==
- Communes of the Vienne department
- Gallo-Roman site of Sanxay
