= Mont-Saint-Aubert =

Village in Wallonia, Belgium

Coordinates: 50.6547°N 3.3997°E

Mont-Saint-Aubert (French pronunciation: [mɔ̃ sɛ̃t‿obɛʁ]) is a village of Wallonia and a district of the municipality of Tournai, located in the province of Hainaut, Belgium.

The village lies at the north side of Tournai.

Aubertianella, a genus of fossil ciliates, found in Eocene beds of Mont de la Trinité near Mont-Saint-Aubert, has received its name after the village.

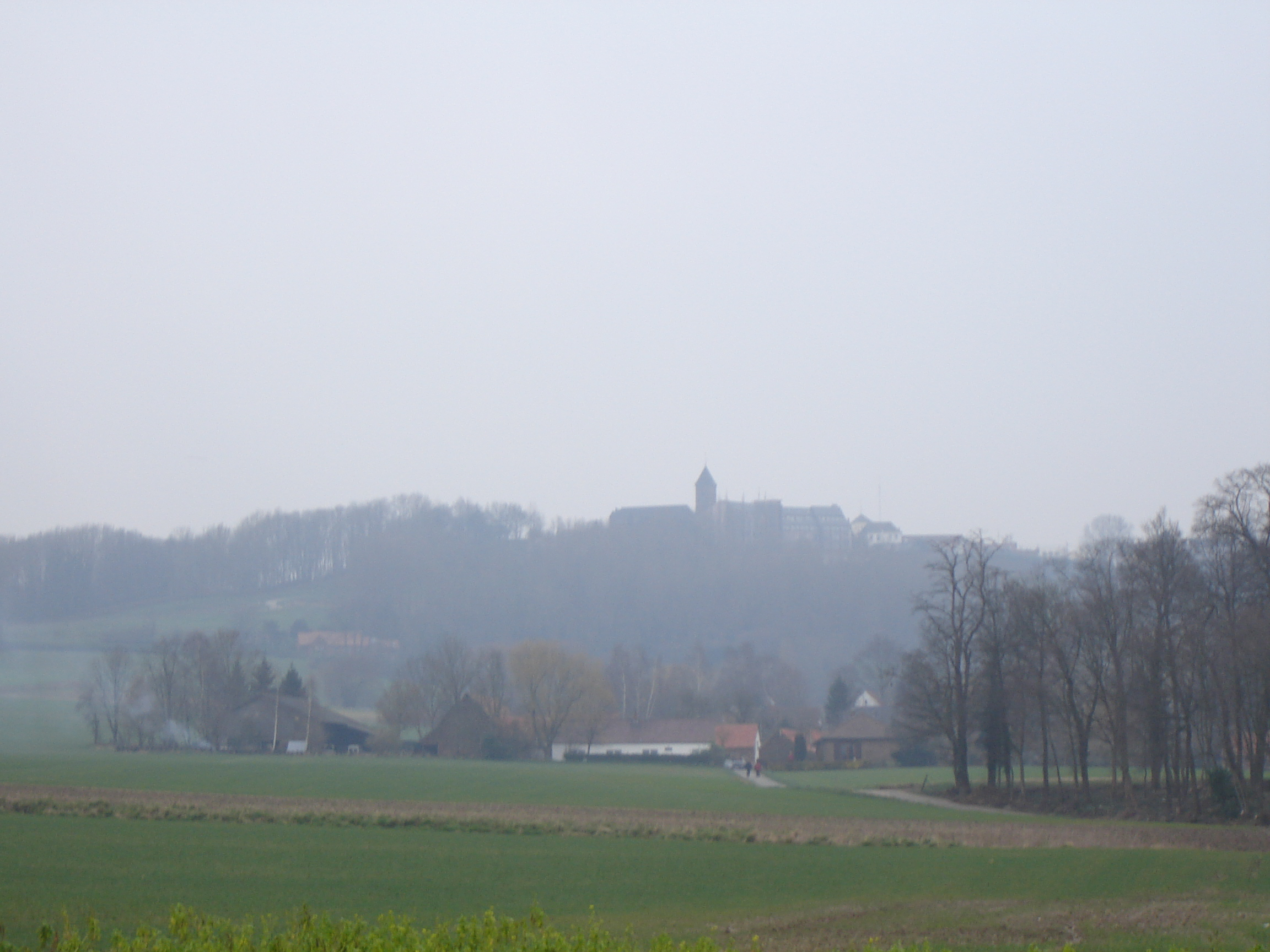
Mont-Saint-Aubert, south side

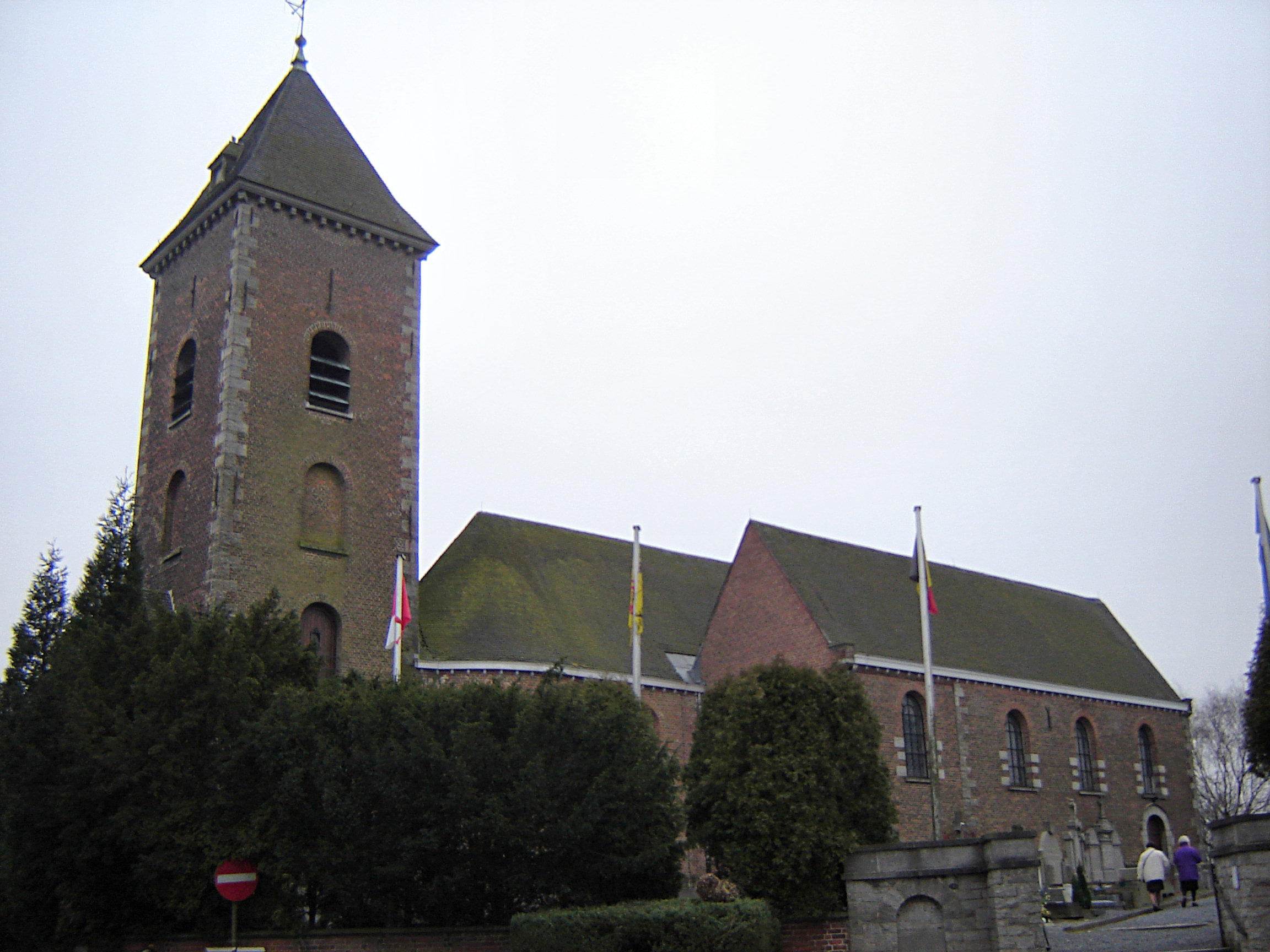
Eglise Saint-Aubert
