= Berthouville =

- Commune
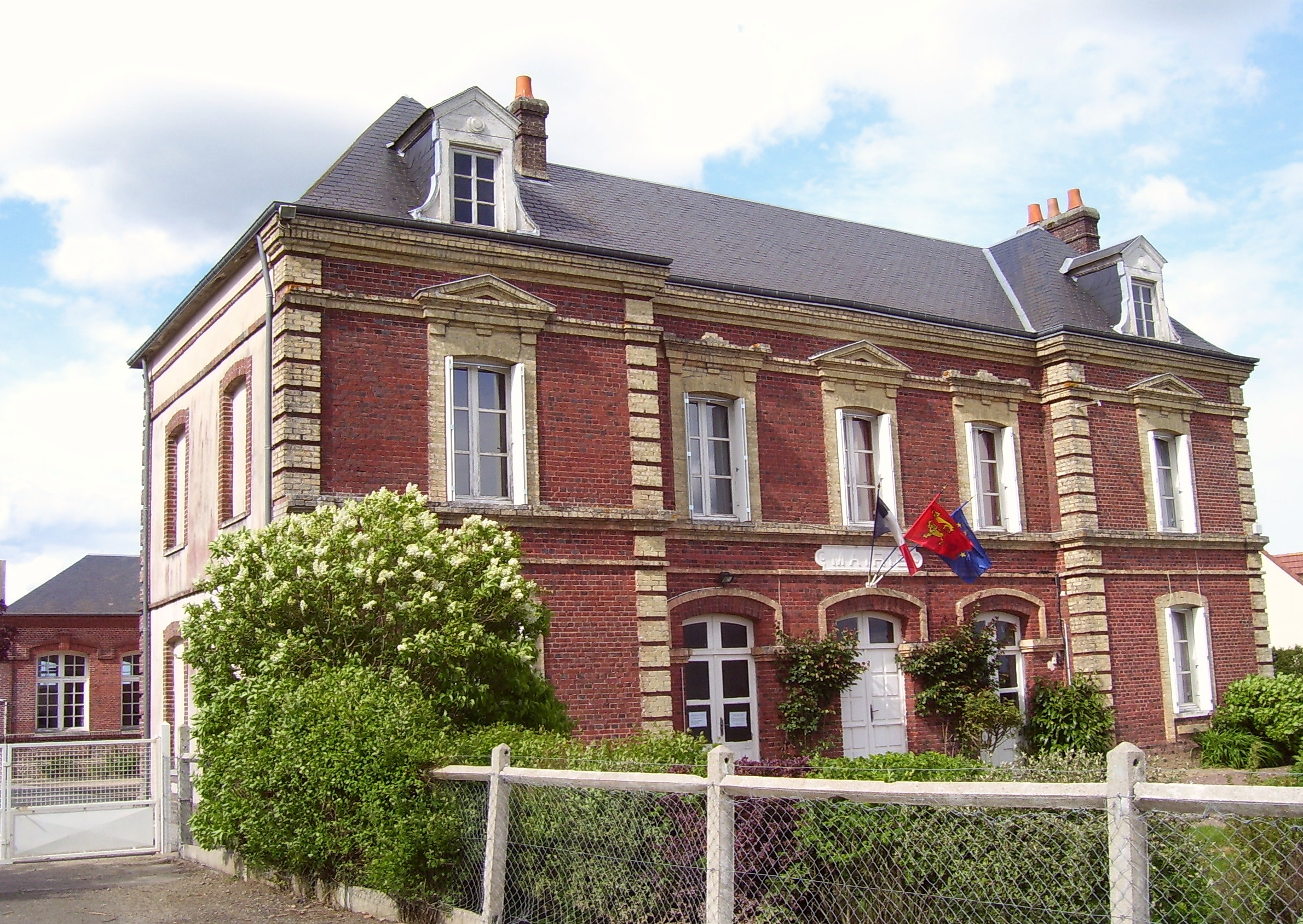
- Town hall
- Location of Berthouville
- Location within France Location within Normandy
- Coordinates: 49°10′49″N 0°38′09″E
- Country: France
- Region: Normandy
- Department: Eure
- Arrondissement: Bernay
- Canton: Brionne

Government
  - Mayor (2020–2026): Marie-Françoise Leclerc
- Area^{1}: 7.53 km^{2} (2.91 sq mi)
- Elevation: 159 m (522 ft)
- Highest elevation: 178 m (584 ft)
- Lowest elevation: 140 m (460 ft)
- Population (2023): 330
  - Density: 44/km^{2} (110/sq mi)
- Time zone: UTC+01:00 (CET)
  - Summer (DST): UTC+02:00 (CEST)
- INSEE/Postal code: 27061 /27800
- ^{1} French Land Register data, which excludes lakes, ponds, glaciers > 1 km^{2} (0.386 sq mi or 247 acres) and river estuaries.

Berthouville (French pronunciation: [bɛʁtuvil]) is a commune in the Eure department in Normandy in northern France.

== Population ==
Historical population
Year	Pop.	±% p.a.
1968	280	—
1975	243	−2.00%
1982	236	−0.42%
1990	233	−0.16%
1999	260	+1.23%
2007	285	+1.15%
2012	298	+0.90%
2017	312	+0.92%
2023	330	+0.94%
Source: INSEE

== Sights ==
The Manoir de Berthouville is a hunting lodge that was built 1652. It is privately owned.

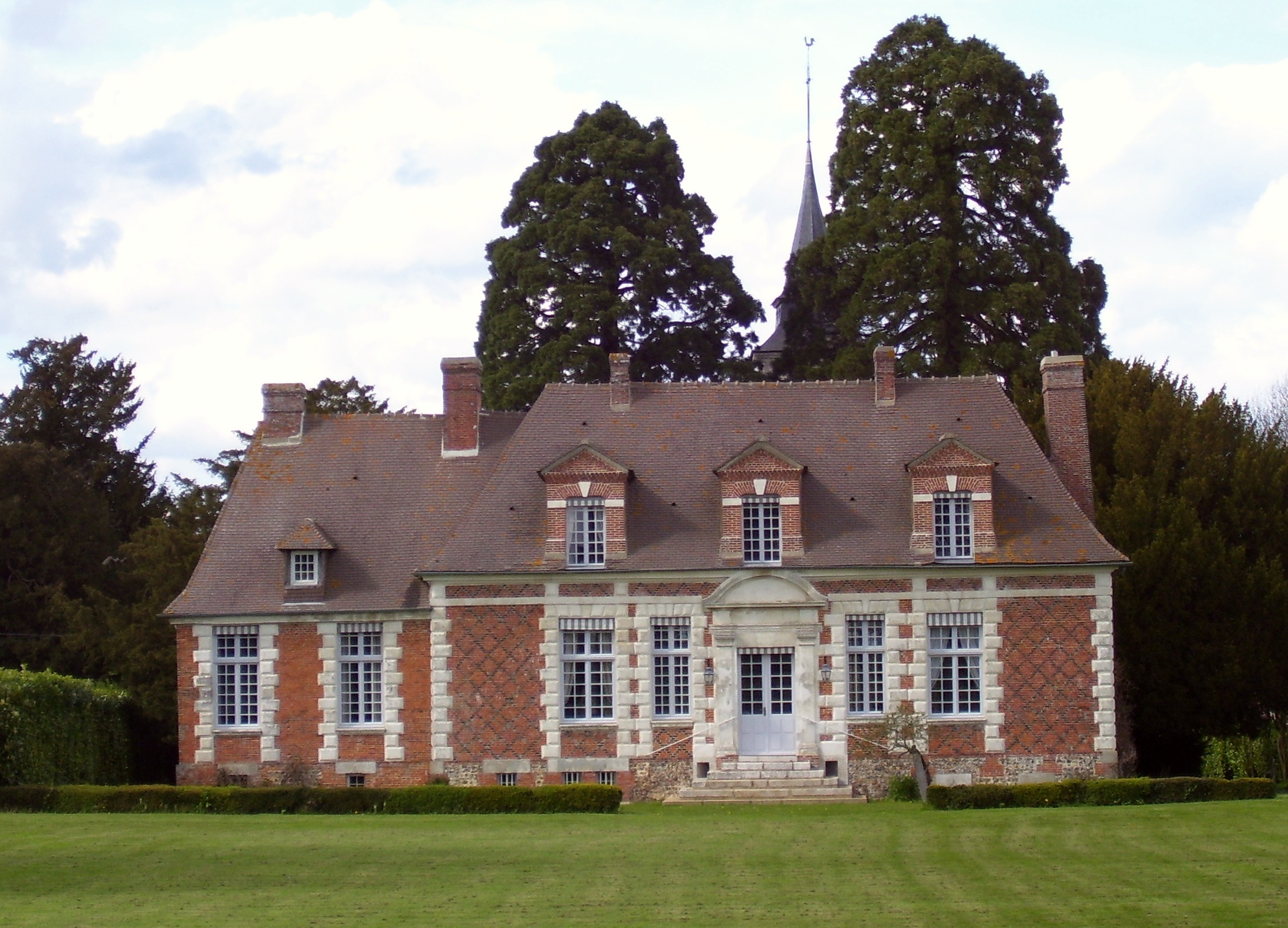
Manoir de Berthouville

== See also ==
- Communes of the Eure department
