= Le Liget Charterhouse =

Former monastery in Indre-et-Loire, France

- Chartreuse du Liget
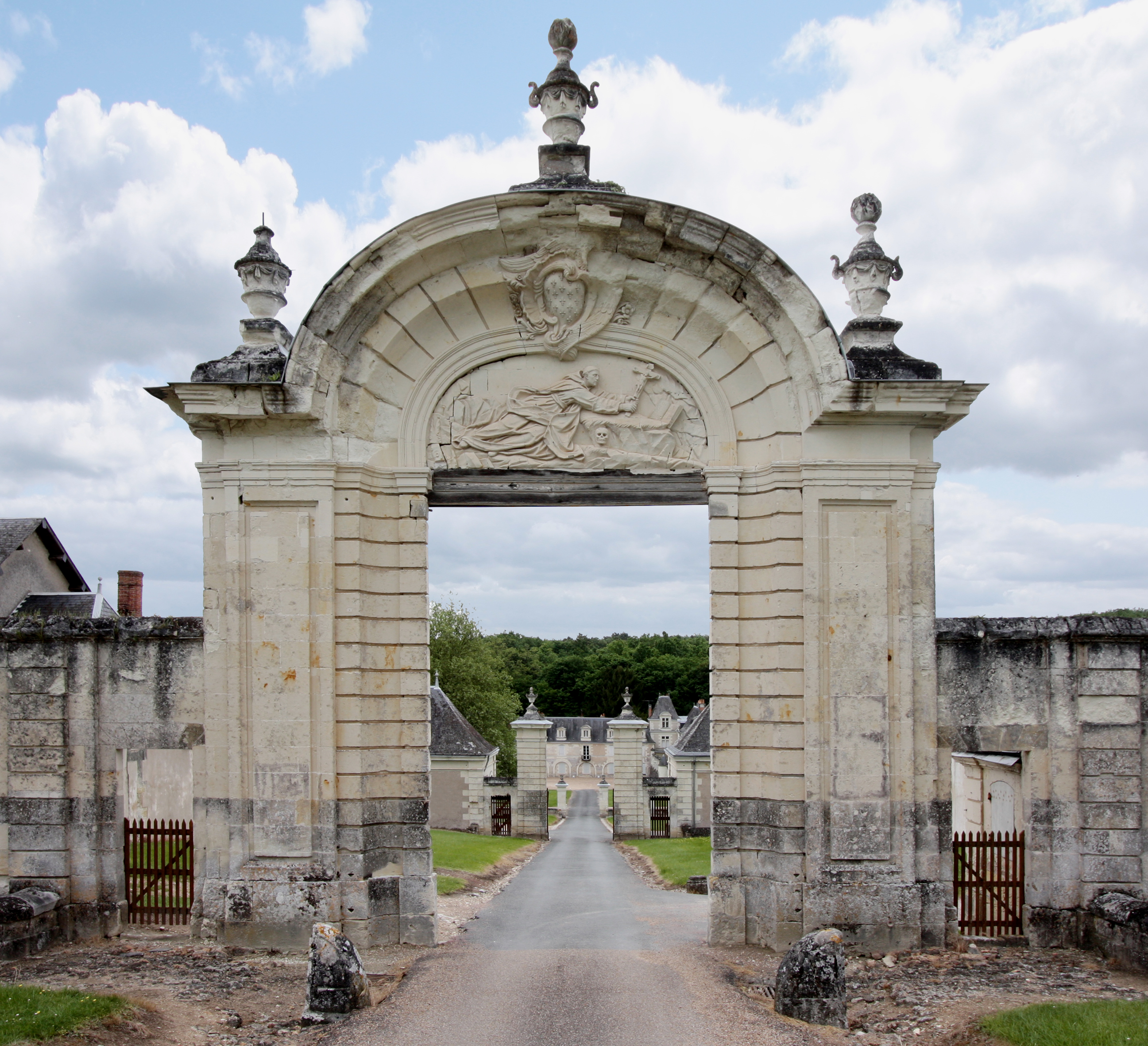
- Gate of Le Liget Charterhouse
- Interactive map of Le Liget Charterhouse
- Location: Chemillé-sur-Indrois, France
- Coordinates: 47°08′39″N 1°07′49″E

Le Liget Charterhouse (French: Chartreuse du Liget) was a Carthusian monastery, or charterhouse, in Chemillé-sur-Indrois, Indre-et-Loire, France, founded in 1178 (Note: The monastery records date the foundation gift as 1178, although historians believe that the date of the start of construction was 1188 or 1189) in Touraine by Henry II, Count of Anjou and King of England, possibly in atonement for the murder of Thomas Becket (Archbishop of Canterbury) committed by his order.

There are only a few remains of the medieval monastery, which was ruined in the Hundred Years War and again in the French Wars of Religion. Rebuilt at the end of the Ancien Régime, it was largely demolished in the French Revolution.

The remains of the monastery structures are registered or listed as a monument historique (including the grounds of a former monastery wall and corner towers, remains of the church and cloister roof joint).

The Corroirie, the fortified gate, the chapel and the old prison were the subjects of an entry in the inventory of monuments historiques of 7 September 1926.

The Chapel of Saint-Jean-du-Liget was listed as a monument historique in 1862.

== Location ==
This monastery is located in Indre-et-Loire 50 kilometres (31 mi) south of Tours, in the heart of the forest of Loches in the town of Chemillé-sur-Indrois.

== History ==
=== Foundation ===
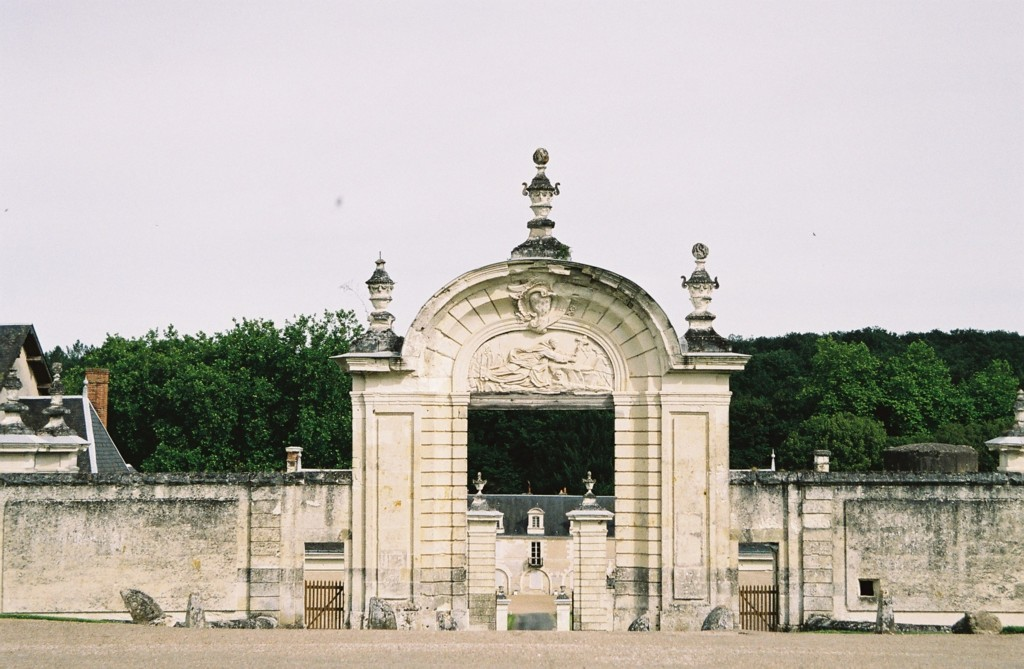
Monumental gate of the charterhouse

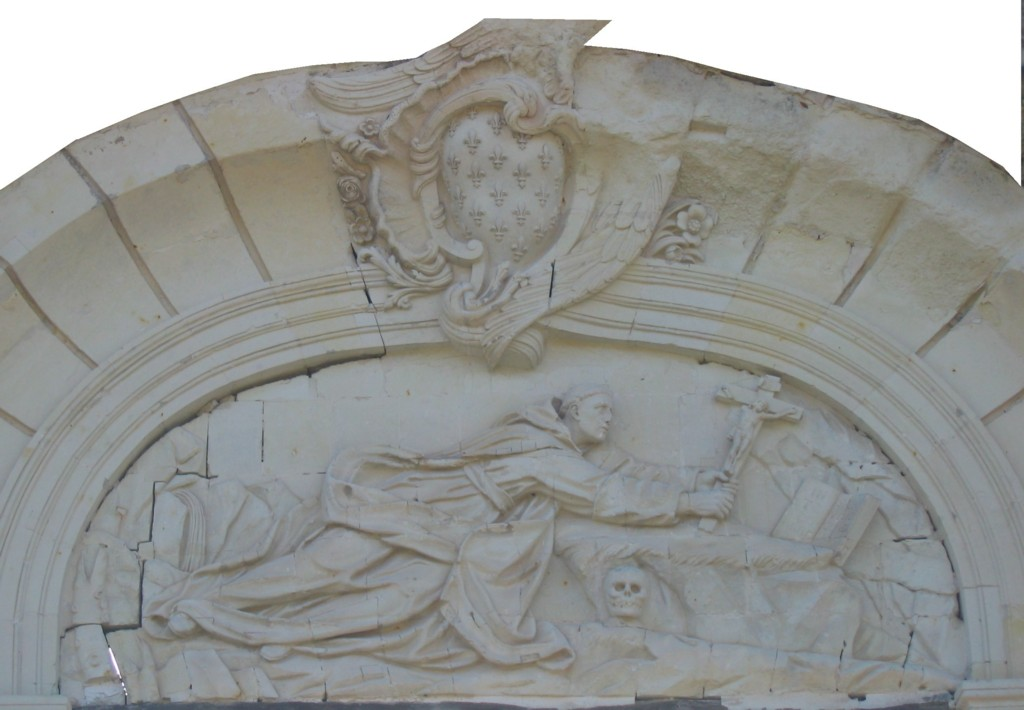
Saint Bruno in prayer (tympanum of the gate, north side)

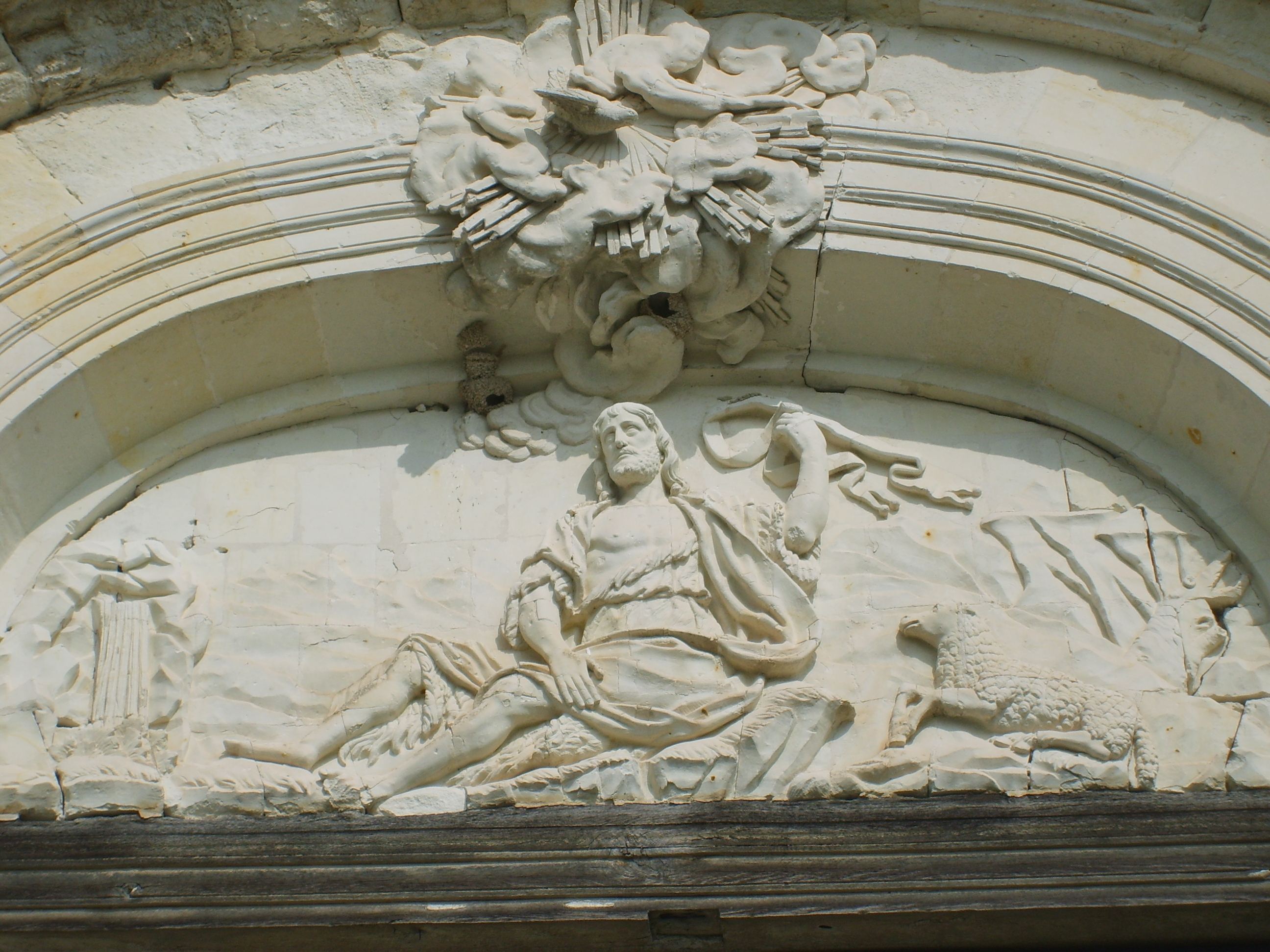
Saint John the Baptist (tympanum of the gate, south side)

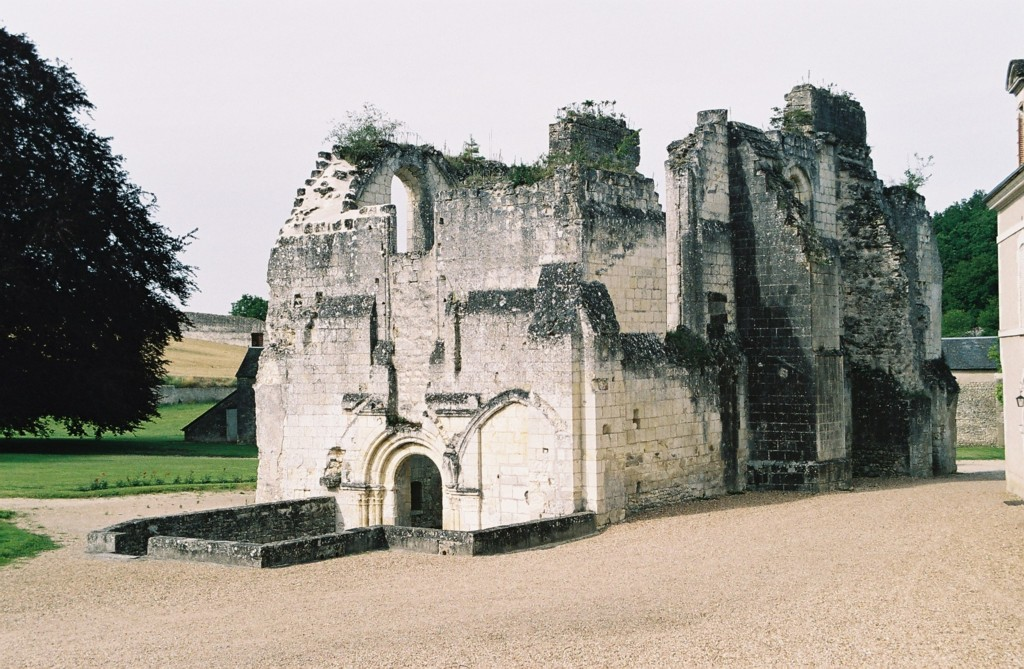
Church of Notre-Dame du Liget

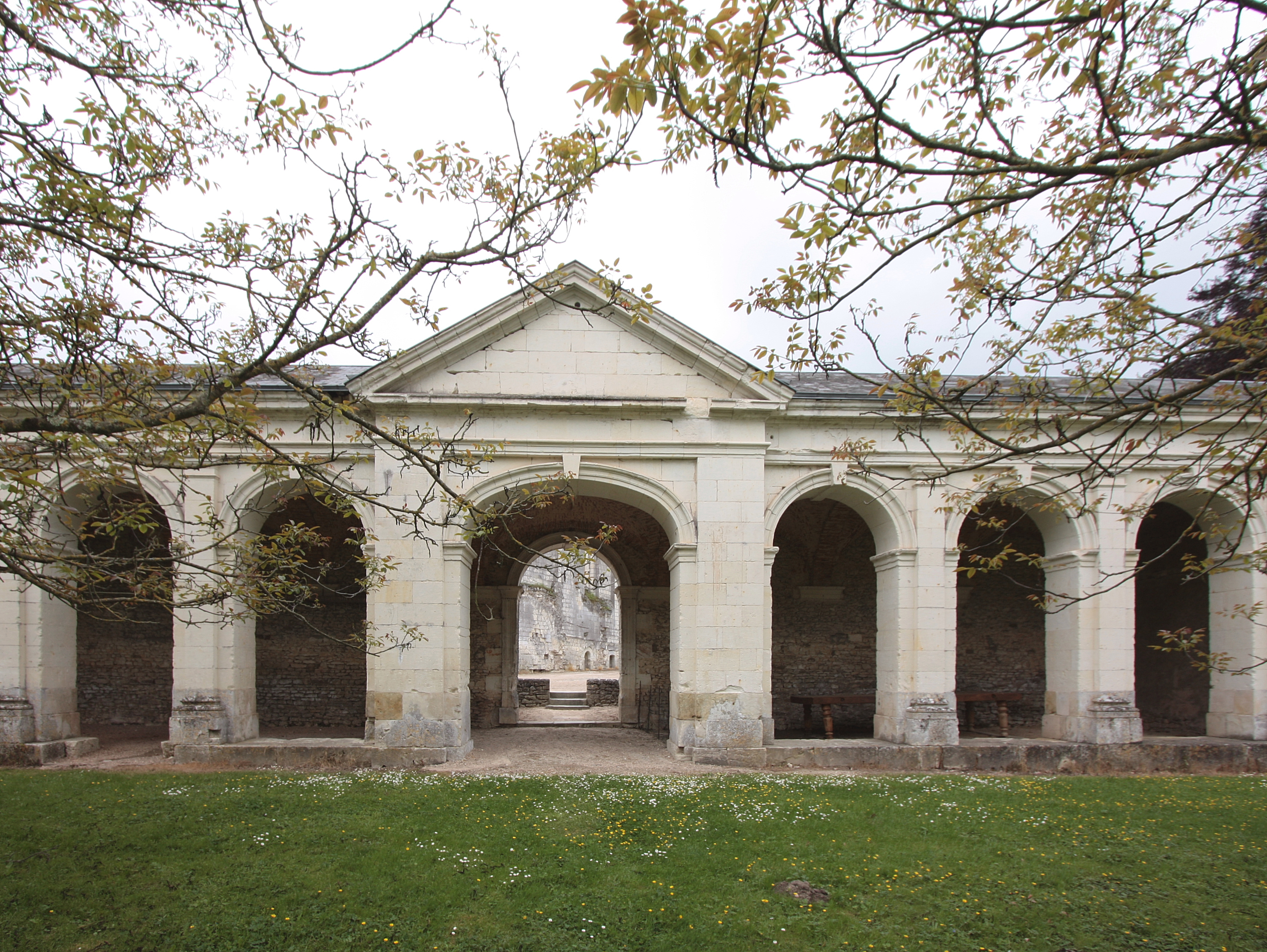
Western wing of the great cloister

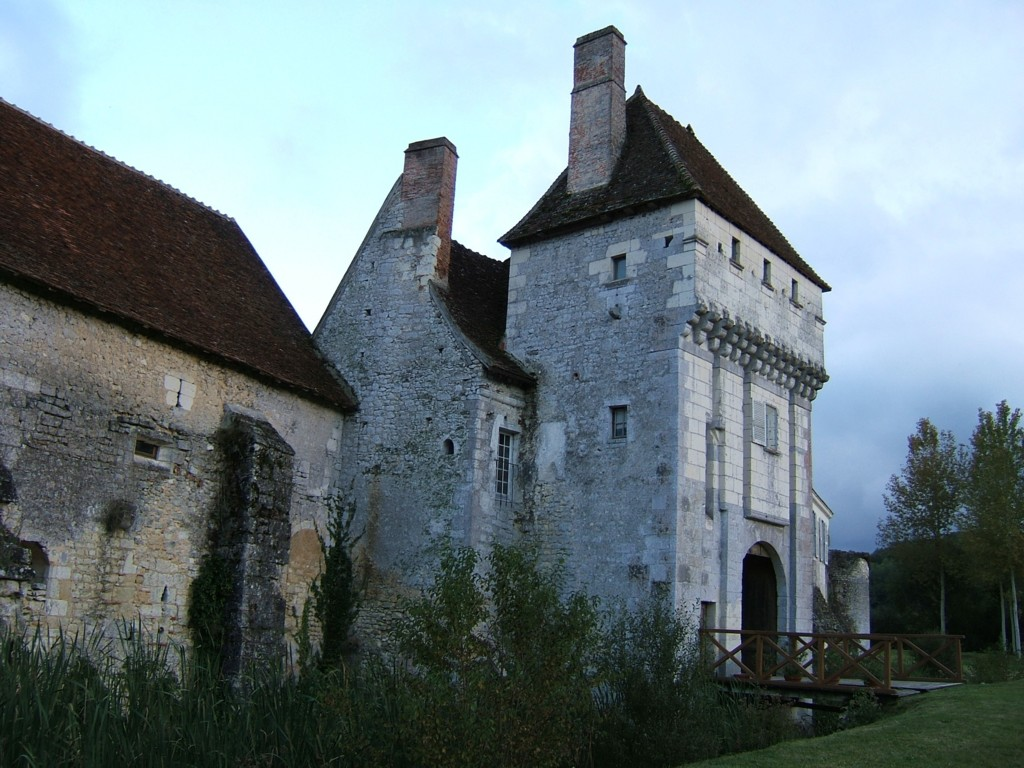
Fortified gate of the Corroirie of Le Liget

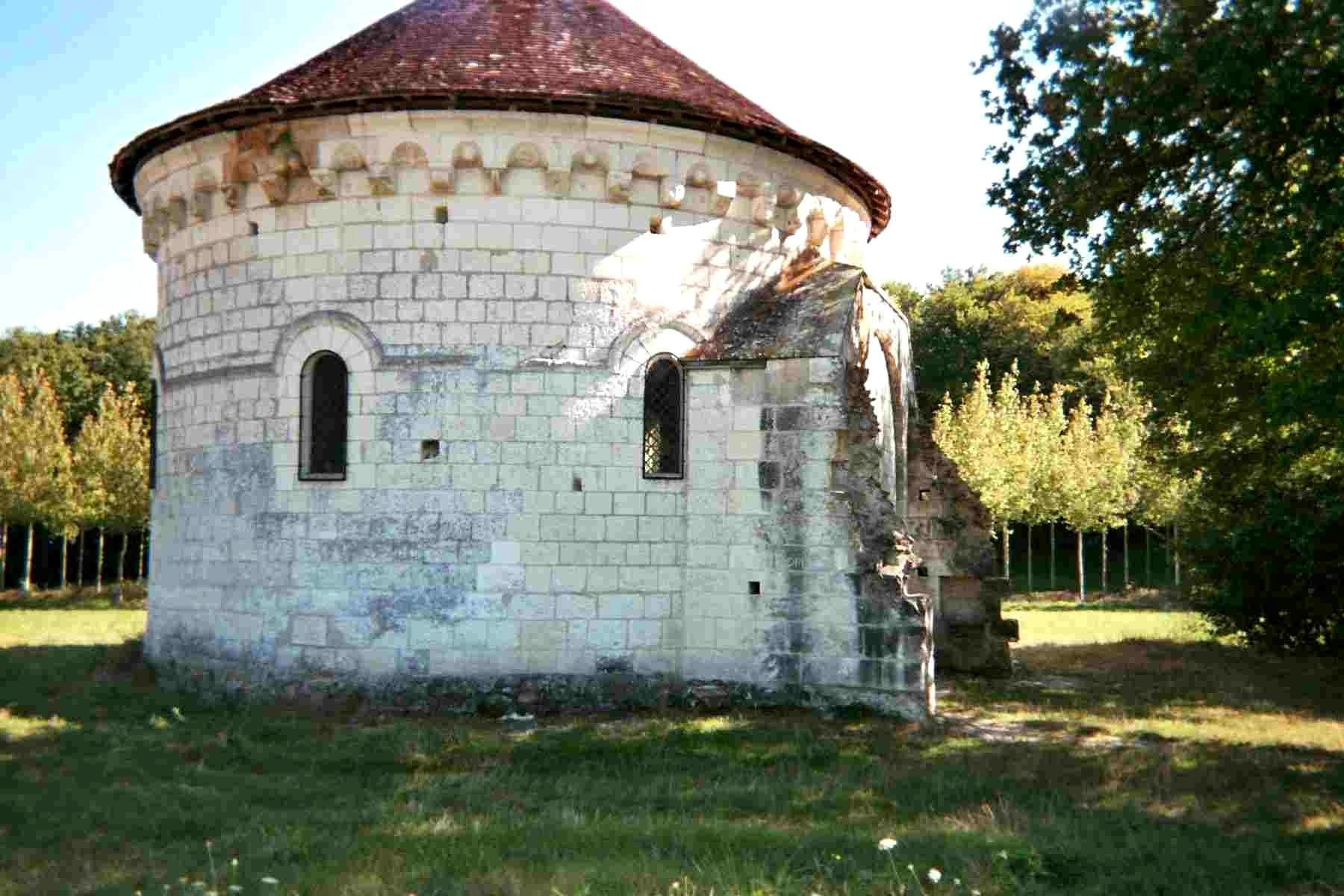
Chapel of Saint-Jean-du-Liget

From his succession to his father in 1151, Henry II, Count of Anjou and King of England, confirmed his authority and Touraine became the hub of the Plantagenet empire, which stretched from the Scottish border to the Pyrenees. The empire made Chinon its capital and encouraged the founding of new monasteries of the Gregorian reform.

It is in this context that in 1153 Henry II allowed four Carthusians from the Grande Chartreuse (founded in 1084 by Saint Bruno), to settle in a place called Ligetum bought from Hervé, abbot of Villeloin, to found a monastery. The name "Ligetum" is probably of Germanic origin, referring to a barren place, mostly wooded. The deed of foundation was dated 1178, was confirmed in 1199 by King John of England and in 1234 by Louis IX of France.

It is frequently asserted that the reason behind the creation of this monastery by Henry II was to make atonement for the murder of Thomas Becket. No mention of this is made in contemporary documents and the legend seems to rely on an inscription, now lost, which adorned the main gate of the charterhouse.

=== Rapid expansion of domain ===
Following the example of other Carthusian monasteries, the Carthusians of Le Liget worked quickly to expand their domain.

The gift of Henry II in 1178 included the grounds of Le Liget and five farms, forming the desert of the monastery, which is to say, an area owned by and surrounding it, intended to preserve its solitude. In 1223, the lands of the fief of Craçay, under the lordship of Loches, some 800 metres (2,600 ft) from the monastery, were given to Le Liget. The Carthusians built their lower house there, known as the Corroirie. This fief included many farms making a total of 800 hectares of land, meadows, pastures, gardens and vineyards, besides more than 500 hectares of forest and 43 hectares of ponds.

The initial monastery building had only twelve monastic cells. In 1363, Charles V founded thirteen more and the community was allowed to acquire 300 livres of annual rent on the royal domain.

=== The Hundred Years' War ===
From the Treaty of Brétigny in 1360, which formalised a truce in the Hundred Years' War, the Anglo-Gascons had to vacate the places they had taken in Touraine. During their retreat, the soldiers turned into looters. They pillaged the city of Tours. In 1361, the Carthusians who had taken refuge in their lower house in the Corroirie, suffered a siege by English gangs. After the siege, about 1379, they dismissed their servants and fled to Loches to a house they had bought. When they returned to Le Liget in the early 15th century, they equipped the Corroirie with the fortifications that still exist today in part. From a stately manor, the Corroirie became a fortress. It served as a refuge during the wars of religion. By letters patent of Charles VII of France dated 12 July 1432, it was even equipped with a garrison by royal command.

=== The second peak (17th and 18th centuries) ===
Between 1598 (Edict of Nantes) and 1629 (death of the Cardinal de Bérulle), spirituality in France was experiencing a boom period. Eventually the Catholic revival flourished until 1660 under the leadership of theologians and intellectuals like Jacques Gallemant but also zealous priests like Pierre de Bérulle, Vincent de Paul, Francis de Sales and the Carthusian Dom Beaucousin, prior of the Carthusians of Paris. It was at this time that Le Liget received some famous guests: Dom Marc-Antoine Durant, for example, the presumed author of a poem about Mary Magdalene, lived in Le Liget for 54 years with Alphonse-Louis du Plessis de Richelieu, elder brother of Cardinal Richelieu. He retired to Le Liget in 1605–1607.

In 1681, the domain of Le Liget extended over 1,000 hectares. The charterhouse accumulated valuable items presented by generous donors such as Hippolyte de Béthune, Count of Selles, nephew of the great Sully, who in 1650 left two paintings attributed to Caravaggio, recently discovered (Note: The discovery of two paintings was in 1999; the official announcement was made in 2006.) in the Church of St. Anthony of Loches.

=== The destruction of buildings during the Revolution ===
On 2 November 1789 the National Assembly decided that all ecclesiastical possessions were to be placed at the disposal of the nation; the following year the property was sold by lots.

On 10 May 1790 a first visit to Le Liget was made by the agents of the district of Chemillé-sur-Indrois. On this first visit, they identified 12 Carthusian monks. Two days later, a first inventory of the property took place, during which inspectors enumerated 6,900 volumes in the library.

The charterhouse was purchased as property of the state on 19 August 1791 for 25,300 livres by Louis Ours Victor Philippe Potier de La Berthellière, Court Judge of Loches, and John Ondet, a merchant of the same city. The buildings were transformed into stables. The Corroirie was, in turn, sold on 1 June 1791 for 7,000 livres to Martin Legrand. The departure of the Carthusian monks seems to have taken place during February 1791.

=== Rebuilding the domain in the 19th century ===
On 6 August 1837 Côme-Édmond Marsay, former mayor of Loches, bought part of the former charterhouse, specifically, the cloister, the harvest room and the chapel. He died in 1838. On 13 December 1862 his two sons Edward and Arthur, having reached their majority, shared the ownership. After several transactions, Arthur de Marsay became sole owner of the whole property, and undertook the initial work of conservation. In Le Liget he acquired land and strove to restore the "desert". At his death in 1888, his second son, René de Marsay, inherited the property and continued the work of his father. In 1899, he managed to restore the Corroirie but died in 1910 leaving no children. After World War I, the land passed to Henri de Marsay, his nephew, who moved to Le Liget in July 1919 with his wife. At his death in 1975, the property covered 700 hectares. The land was then divided among his six daughters.

Much of the property latterly belonged to Mme Elie Benoît Arnould, born Anne-Marie de Marsay (died 2023). The remainder, including the Corroirie, is occupied by the Comtesse Guy Boula de Mareüil, born Germaine de Marsay.

== Description ==
Le Liget, like all charterhouses, is composed of two principal parts: the upper house, principally containing the cells of the Fathers, and the lower house, for the accommodation of the Brothers, known here as the Corroirie.

Le Liget also has an isolated chapel, the Chapel of Saint-Jean-du-Liget, in a clearing not far from the upper house.

=== Upper house ===
Plans left by the architect Jacquemin Touraine in 1787 give an idea of the buildings that formed the upper house at Le Liget. Located at the bottom of a depression near a waterhole surrounded by forest, it included two courtyards. The outer courtyard was flanked by long buildings containing the common kitchen, bread oven, smithy and other workshops. The small cloister or inner courtyard overlooked the chapter house, refectory, library and church. Behind the church was the large cloister which contained the cemetery. The 18 individual cells of the monks surrounded this cloister. Each cell was completely independent, consisting of a small dwelling surrounded by a garden.

=== Lower house ===
About a kilometre from the upper house, a place of prayer, the lower house, also known as the Corroirie, had the purpose of ensuring the material existence of the monks (the word corroirie, or 'correrie as is the usual form in other French charterhouses, may come from the Latin conderium or conderia, which refers to everything the monks need to survive: food, clothing and maintenance' (Note: The etymology of corroirie or correrie is still subject to controversy. The word usually refers to a place for the preparation of leather. Another origin might well be found in the ancient French word conréer or corroyer. This polysemous verb means "to arrange" or "prepare". The Corroirie was the place where food was prepared, where all that was necessary was made available for the maintenance of the Fathers and Brothers of the Carthusians.)). There were mills, a press, and barns. A chapel, built in the 14th century, stands in the grounds of the Corroirie of Liget. The latter is also the place which carries manorial rights. As such, the Carthusians therefore constituted a feudal power in Touraine. They enjoyed all privileges, including the right to justice, (Note: H 167 page 93 accessed July 8, 2014.) repeatedly renewed until 1789.

=== The Chapel of St. John ===
This chapel was built in the late 12th century, probably to commemorate the original establishment of the first Carthusian Fathers at Le Liget, shortly after it was founded. The main church of the charterhouse and this chapel are in later Romanesque style. The interior must have been completely covered with frescoes from the end of the 12th century or beginning of the 13th century. It was abandoned by the Carthusians from the 16th century.

== Remains ==
=== The charterhouse ===
- The monumental entrance gate is in the north wall of the monastery. Dating from the 12th century, it is topped by a tympanum decorated on the outside with a bas-relief of St. Bruno (founder of the Carthusian order) and on the inside with one of John the Baptist praying, the patron saint of the monastery.
- Nothing remains of the Romanesque church, whose construction was completed in 1189, the walls of the nave in four sections. The façade still has its arched door. The arches and the tower which were built on top of the chancel and apse which closed the dormitory have disappeared. Acoustic pottery is embedded in the walls of the nave to improve the sound inside the church.
- The rectangular grand cloister - a characteristic architectural element of Carthusian monasteries - whose reconstruction had begun two years before the start of the French Revolution under the direction of Touraine architect Jean-Bernard-Abraham Jacquemin - is badly damaged. Little remains of the west wing. On the walls of the grand cloister are still visible several windows that allowed the serving of meals, taken in their cells by hermit monks.
- The walls of the protected area of the charterhouse are high. At each corner was built a watchtower; that in the northwest corner of the cloister is more elaborate. Such defences were built for protection following the religious wars during which the monastery was plundered and devastated several times.

=== The Corroirie ===
A little more than 1 km (0.62 mi) east of the monastery, along the D760 road, the Corroirie has retained important vestiges of its buildings.

- The fortified gate, rebuilt in the 15th century, is in the form of a square tower provided with a walkway protected by battlements, breached by a door and a postern formerly defended by drawbridges.
- The chapel dates from the end of the 12th century, but was raised in the 15th century in two stages; the first is equipped with arrowslits. Its very simple plan has a nave with an apse extended by two four-sided bays.
- The prison is a turret isolated from the other buildings. Its only access was through a door opening upstairs, the cell being located on the ground floor.

=== The Chapel of St. John of Liget ===
Built in the twelfth century, the chapel, dedicated to St. John the Baptist (Saint-Jean-Baptiste), is located in the town of Sennevières, bordering Chemillé-sur-Indrois about 750 metres (2,460 ft) "as the crow flies" southwest of the monastery, back from the road from Loches to Montrésor. It is almost in its original state.

It probably commemorates the original settlement of monks in the region and was built in the last quarter of the 12th century on a circular plan, of diameter 7 m (23 ft) and height 6 m (20 ft)), but less than 25 years later, a nave was added that was 8 m (26 ft) long, which was later destroyed; the cutaways on the curved wall of the chapel are still visible. Eight semicircular windows illuminate the rotunda.

Some of the frescoes decorating the chapel have survived; they are on the panels separating the windows. Dating from the early 13th century, they figuratively illustrate the great mysteries of Christianity. Restoration work was undertaken in 2008.

== See also ==
- Chartreux
- Saint Bruno

== Sources ==
- Archives Départementales d'Indre-et-Loire (Departmental Archives of Indre-et-Loire), H 167 to H 193
- Meunier, Christophe (2007). La Chartreuse du Liget. éditions Hugues de Chivré. p. 172. ISBN 978-2-916043-15-9. Meunier2007.
- Philippon, Albert (1935). La Chartreuse du Liget (in French). Tours: Mame.
- Ranjard, Robert (1986). La Touraine archéologique [Archaeological Touraine] (in French). Mayenne: Imprimerie de la Manutention. ISBN 2-85554-017-8. Ranjard1986.
