= Corroirie =

Fortified feudal fief in France

La Corroirie
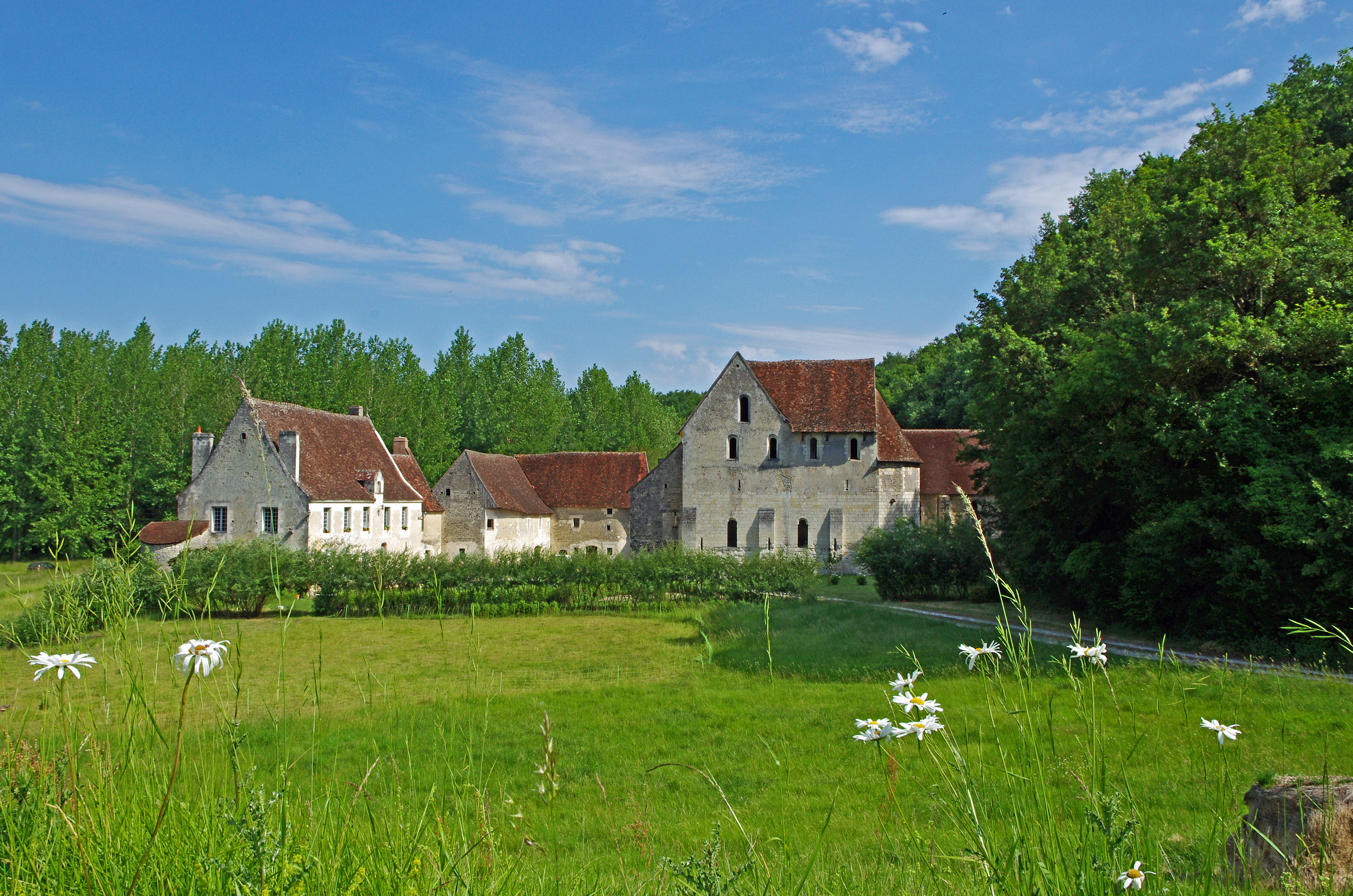
- General view of the buildings from the south.

- Location within France

General information
- Type: Fortified monastic farm
- Architectural style: Romanesque architecture, Gothic, French Renaissance
- Location: Loches to Montrésor Route, Chemillé-sur-Indrois commune, Indre-et-Loire department, Centre-Val de Loire region., France
- Coordinates: 47°09′03″N 01°08′24″E
- Construction started: From the 17th to 18th century
- Owner: Private land

Design and construction
- Awards and prizes: Monument historique (1926, gateway, church and prison) Monument historique (2015, whole site) Classed site (1947, La Corroirie, chartreuse and surroundings)

La Corroirie is a fortified feudal stronghold belonging to the neighboring Chartreuse du Liget, located in the commune of Chemillé-sur-Indrois, in the Indre-et-Loire department, Centre-Val de Loire region.

Likely founded at the end of the 11th century, it became the Charterhouse's lower house, whose lay brothers were responsible for managing the monastery's extensive agricultural estate (nearly 1,500 hectares at Le Liget, as well as tenant farms in the Loches region). Its buildings were gradually expanded over the following centuries, with periods of expansion alternating with phases of fortification following the Hundred Years' War and the Wars of Religion. In the 16th century, La Corroirie was transformed into a stronghold, with the construction of a monumental fortified gate at the entrance. In the second half of the 17th century, the friars who lived there left to take up residence in the upper residence, and the church was closed to worshipers: the lower residence lost its religious role and became a farm. One of the particularities of La Corroirie is that it was also a fief with legal rights over its territory from the Middle Ages to the French Revolution, as evidenced by the presence of a prison on the site. Sold as national property during the Revolution, after the last monks had left the Carthusian monastery in early 1791, the Corroirie buildings suffered little damage and are still maintained and inhabited into the 21st century.

The church, fortified gateway and prison of La Corroirie were listed as historic monuments in 1926; the listing was extended to the entire site in 2015. As from 1947, La Corroirie, along with the buildings of the upper house and their surroundings, are part of a listed site.

== Location and toponymy ==
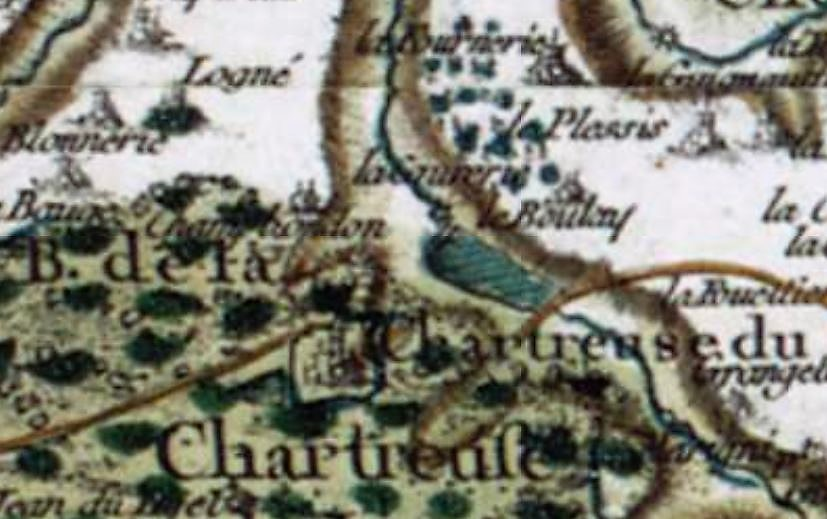
"La Courerie" on the Cassini map.

La Corroirie is located in the Chemillé-sur-Indrois commune, around 3 km southwest of the main town. Its buildings back onto the righthand bank of the hill, in the Ruisseau d'Aubigny valley, a Indrois tributary, at the mouth of Ruisseau du Liget's secondary valley. To the south-west of the latter, are the buildings of the upper house -so named because the prayer activities carried out there bring it symbolically closer to Heaven- of the chartreuse du Liget, 1.1 km from La Corroiere, and 2 km away from the Saint-Jean du Liget chapel. All these distances are expressed as "à vol d'oiseau".

To the south of the buildings is the Corroirie pond, established on the Aubigny by the Carthusian monks. At this point, the D 760 from Loches to Montrésor is built on the northern embankment of the pond, separating it from the buildings, whereas previously, it ran around the pond to the west and then south, as shown on the Cassini map. Nevertheless, by 1897, the pond was poorly maintained and partially sunken. The small area designated for construction, with no possibility of expansion, may explain the architectural decision, over the centuries, to raise the buildings to increase their capacity.

A manuscript written by a Carthusian monk in 1625 states "Correya est domus inferior Carthusianorum", the Cassini map mentions "La Courerie" and the Napoleonic cadastre indicates "La Couroirie". The low houses of the monasteries, dedicated to manual and agricultural activities, close to the land and dedicated to the accommodation of the lay brothers, generally take the name of correries. The term is a possible but controversial derivative of the "corrier", designating in Lyonnais and Dauphiné, in the Middle Ages, the prosecutor responsible for managing the property of a bishop or an abbot. This word would itself be formed from the Latin conredium, designating all that relates to the material life of a monk, but this term may have been used by other monastic orders before the foundation of the Charterhouses. This proposal is more plausible than a reference to corroyage, a stage in the preparation of hide for the manufacture of parchment, or even a post office for couriers, leads mentioned by ancient authors.

== History ==
=== Foundation ===
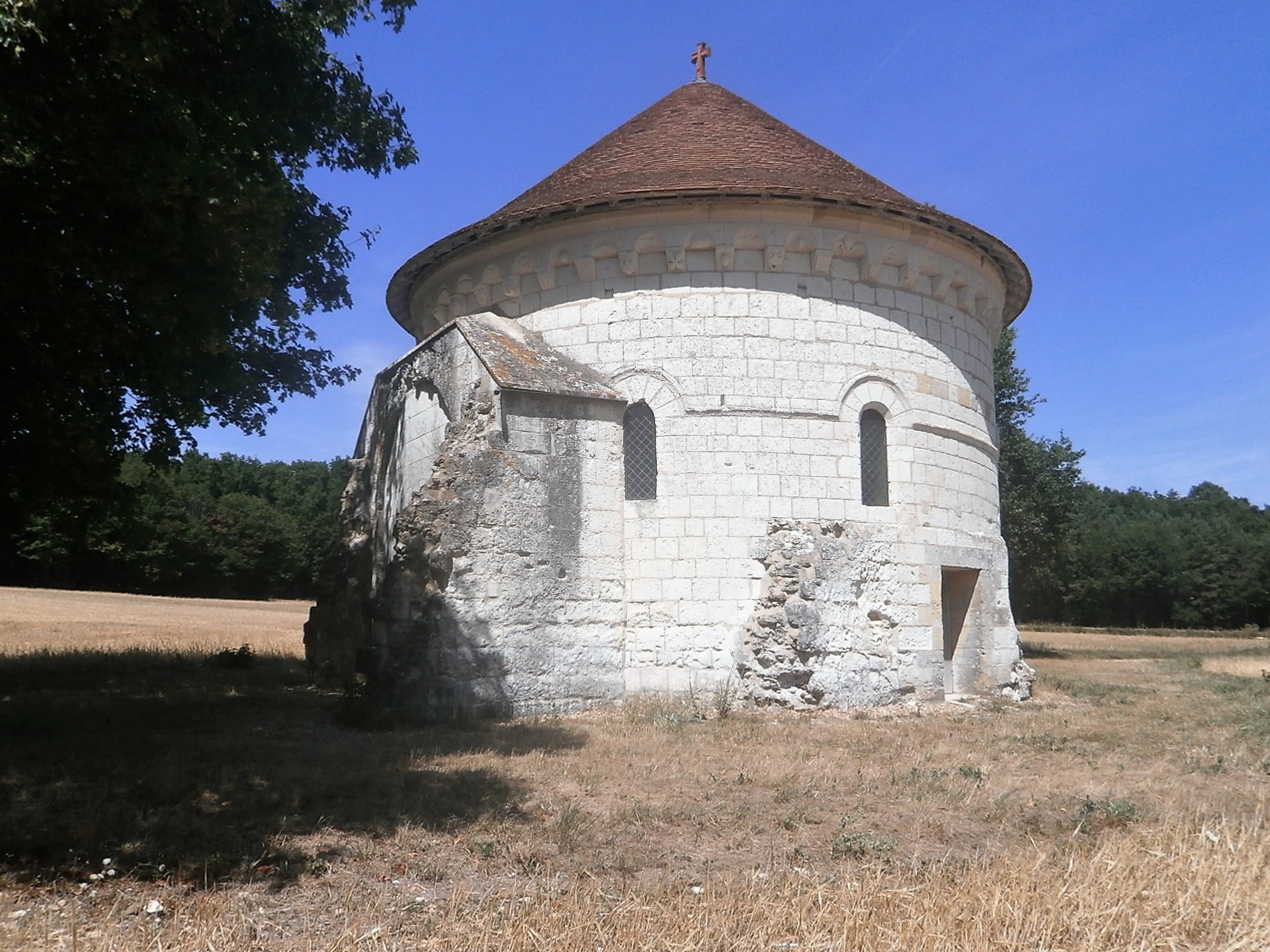
Saint-Jean du Liget chapel

The land of Liget seems to have been bought from the Abbey of Villeloin by Henri II of England between 1176 and 1183 and then given to a small Benedictine monastic community on the condition that it join the Carthusian order. After that, the chapel of Saint-Jean du Liget and the first buildings of the upper house were built. Before the Carthusians settled there, the location of Corroirie was called Craçay or Crassay and was not part of the initial donation. It is a fief that, around 1200 B.C., Lord Foulques de Craçay gave to the monks of Liget. The donation, although disputed by the heirs of Foulques after his death, was confirmed.

The exact date and circumstances of the foundation of the Corroirie are difficult to determine, due to the absence of reliable sources and convincing architectural leads. However, from a dedication of the church by the bishop of Paris Odon de Sully in 1206, it seems that the first structures were built in the last decade of the 12th century and the first two decades of the 13th century. From this first phase of construction, two structures with an unknown function were built, perhaps a pantry/dormitory and a refectory, as well as the church which could have been started a shortly before the other buildings, and consecrated prior its completion.

The foundation of the chartreuse, in which Henri II took an active part, but, above all, that of Corroirie on the road between Loches and Montrésor, whose donjons were built by Foulques Nerra, reinforced the authority of the house of Anjou which now had three solid positions in the same territory. It is the Corroirie, and not the upper house itself, which is the seat of Liget's seigneurialism, thus consecrating the extremely distinct separation of the charterhouses between the temporal and the spiritual.

=== Thriving in defensive retreats ===
==== Medieval development ====
Territory managed by La Corroirie in the 17th century. (Note: The territory administered by La Corroirie includes the original monastic enclosure, or "desert", generally demarcated by a moat, as well as the surrounding fiefs and tenant farms.) forests and coppices. other lands. dwellings, including farmhouses. chartreuse's enclosure.

Fiefs and tenant farms held by La Corroirie on behalf of the Carthusian monastery of Liget in the Lochois region.

The monastery truly flourished between the mid-13th and mid-14th centuries. Over a hundred donations during this period – most from local seigneurs, though some came from the royalty- enriched the estate. According to a seventeenth-century inventory, the domain managed by the Corroirie on behalf of the Carthusian monastery covered almost 1,480 hectares of arable land, meadows, vineyards, woods and ponds, grouped around it. Several other fiefs and tenant farms, within a radius of more than 15 km, also came under the jurisdiction of the Liget, such as the Bergeresse fiefdom in Azay-sur-Indre.

To cope with this increased activity, substantial improvements were made to the buildings at La Corroirie. The existing buildings were enlarged or heightened to accommodate a greater number of lay brothers (whose numbers were not specified); a large hall was built to the west, perhaps to serve as a chapter house and a manorial court – the rights of high and low justice granted to the Carthusian monastery were confirmed in 1352, and the list of the Carthusian monastery's bailiffs is available from 1497. Numerous deeds testify to the sometimes difficult, even conflictual, relations between the judicial officers of La Corroirie and those of the bailiwick of Loches between the mid-14th century and the late 17th century, but the rights of justice granted to La Corroirie were renewed by each king of France until the French Revolution.

The spatial layout of such an ensemble of buildings requires an enclosure to materialize its unity. It is therefore likely that the lower house had a courtyard enclosed by the existing buildings and additional walls, with a monumental porch opening to the south towards the Loches-Montrésor road. In the absence of any vestige, this assumption remains at the hypothesis stage.

==== Shelter during the Hundred Years' War ====
In 1361, an armed force linked to the English party (Note: After the signing of the Treaty of Brétigny in 1360, English and Gascon soldiers no longer intervened in the name of their country's army, but formed autonomous bands of raiders. They were joined by local adventurers and bandits.) besieged La Corroirie, but the monks of the upper house who had initially taken refuge there, using an underground passage, were able to successfully escape the siege and flee to Loches. Another assault took place in 1392, and it was only later that the monks left Loches to return to the Carthusian monastery. One of the immediate consequences of the Hundred Years' War was the construction of a portcullis in the west building to secure access to the courtyard; it replaced the access from the south, which had been sealed off. Once the war was over and the monks had returned, work began on a major project to backfill the entire site, both inside and outside the buildings, up to a height of around 1.5 m, probably to protect the Corroirie from the risk of flooding. The buildings were again expanded. A floor was added to the church, perhaps to house dormitories. Around the mid-15th century, the church's attic was transformed into a bastion, with the addition of arrowslits and the construction of an internal walkway. In 1432, King Charles VII commissioned a small garrison to defend La Corroirie and the upper house.

The creation of the gatehouse, in addition to its usefulness in La Corroirie's defensive system, also had a more symbolic role: it oriented the Corroirie's opening westwards in the direction of the Carthusian monastery's upper house, reinforcing the ties between the two groups of buildings. It may also have been intended to shorten the distance between the two places, making it easier to take refuge in the event of an attack.

==== Looting during the Wars of Religion ====
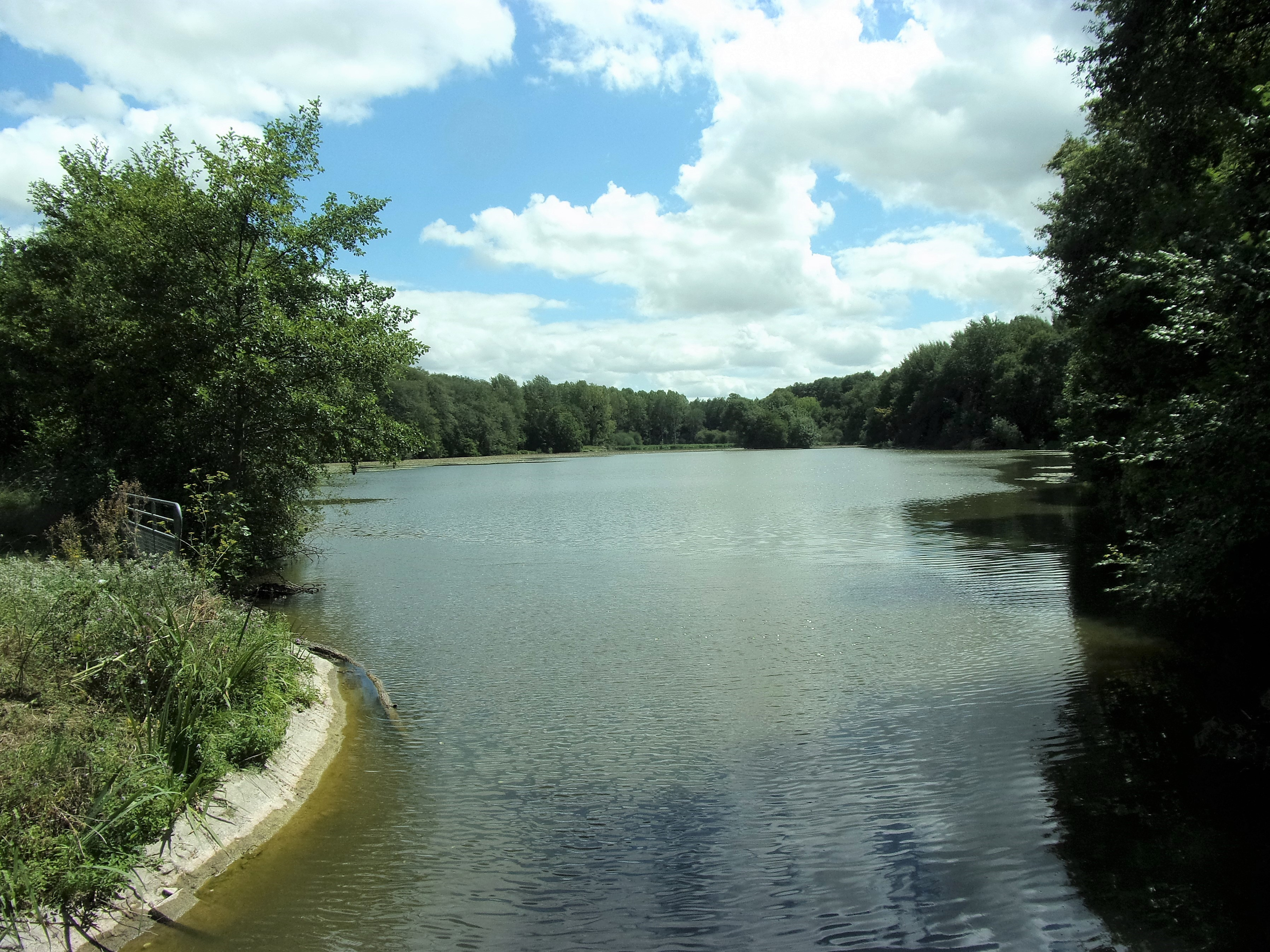
Corroirie's pond.

The Wars of Religion had serious consequences for the Chartreuse du Liget. In 1562, the Prior was murdered and the abbey was completely devastated. Due to a lack of reliable sources, it is difficult to determine whether this attack was carried out by "organized" Protestants who came from Tours, where they operated from April to July, or by bands of looters operating independently. The monks temporarily withdrew. In 1584, new raids were carried out on the lower house and surrounding farms. From March 4 to 7, 1589, the "preneurs de Barbetz" attacked La Corroirie, with nearby farmers joining in the raids; (Note: On this occasion, the farmers burned some of the property deeds in the hope of freeing themselves from their debts to the Carthusian monastery. They then headed for Villeloin Abbey.) this episode is reported in two chronicles of that time.

The decision was then taken to transform La Corroirie into a fortified house. A fortified gatehouse equipped with a drawbridge commanded the entrance, a bretèche was added to the west gable of the cellars, towers and watchtowers were built around the perimeter wall, buttresses supported the most fragile buildings, and a moat was dug. It was no doubt at this time that La Corroirie's pond was built along the course of the Aubigny River to provide a regular supply of water for the moat, thanks to its spillway. Finally, a turret-shaped prison was built inside the enclosure, away from other buildings to the north. This work lasted until the early 17th century.

=== Reconversion ===
The second half of the 17th century marked a turning point in the history of La Corroirie. Two watermills were built in 1671 and subsequently renovated on several occasions; the presence of La Corroirie's pond ensured regular operation of the two bottom-fed wheels, which were initially installed one directly behind the other. The church was closed to worshipers towards the end of 1674, and the religious servants who had been living at La Corroirie were moved to the upper house itself, presumably as early as mid-1600. The servants, nonetheless, continued to reside on-site. This arrangement seems to anticipate a decision taken by the Order's General Chapter in 1678, which applied to all Carthusian monasteries. La Corroirie thus refocused on agricultural activities, to the detriment of its original religious vocation.

The quality of life within the buildings was improved (more efficient heating, better access to upper floors, new or extended bays), but this phase has not been dated, and it is not possible to determine whether it corresponds to the extensive remodeling of the upper house buildings as part of a vast project launched in 1787, but interrupted by the French Revolution.

Blazon of the Marsay family. (Note: Blazon: sand color, golden fleurs-de-lys seeds.)

Following the French Revolution and the abolition of monastic orders, the conversion of La Corroirie into a farm, a process already well underway, came to an end. In 1789, La Corroirie was administered by just two lay brothers, who lived in the upper house. The Carthusian monks left the monastery in early 1791, and on June 1 of the same year, the buildings were sold as biens nationaux. Ownership changed several times, and the estate was even divided up at times. In 1899, it passed into the hands of the Marsay family. Since then, La Corroirie has remained the property of this family, either directly or by marriage, and is still inhabited in 2018, preserving the buildings from deterioration; part of its premises were converted into guest rooms in the 21st century. Nevertheless, the general appearance of the house remains much as it was in the late Middle Ages.

In 1926, the fortified gateway, chapel, and former prison were listed as Monument Historique; in 2015, the listing was extended to the entire site via a ministerial decree published on April 22, 2016. On July 31, 1947, La Corroirie, along with the upper house and the surrounding land, became part of a new classified site under the law of May 2nd, 1930.

== Building descriptions ==
Map of La Corroirie in the 21st century.

Many buildings have been constructed at La Corroirie. Some have changed function as they have been remodeled; others have been partially destroyed, making it difficult to trace the evolution of the buildings on a single plan. The buildings that remain in place in the 21st century are listed here according to the use to which they might have been put during the 18th century before the French Revolution, even if this use remains hypothetical for some of them. However, the fact that La Corroirie has been continuously occupied since the Middle Ages helps to keep the buildings in good condition, as total destruction is rare and only affects buildings that were built at a late date and demolished fairly quickly.

=== The fortified gate ===
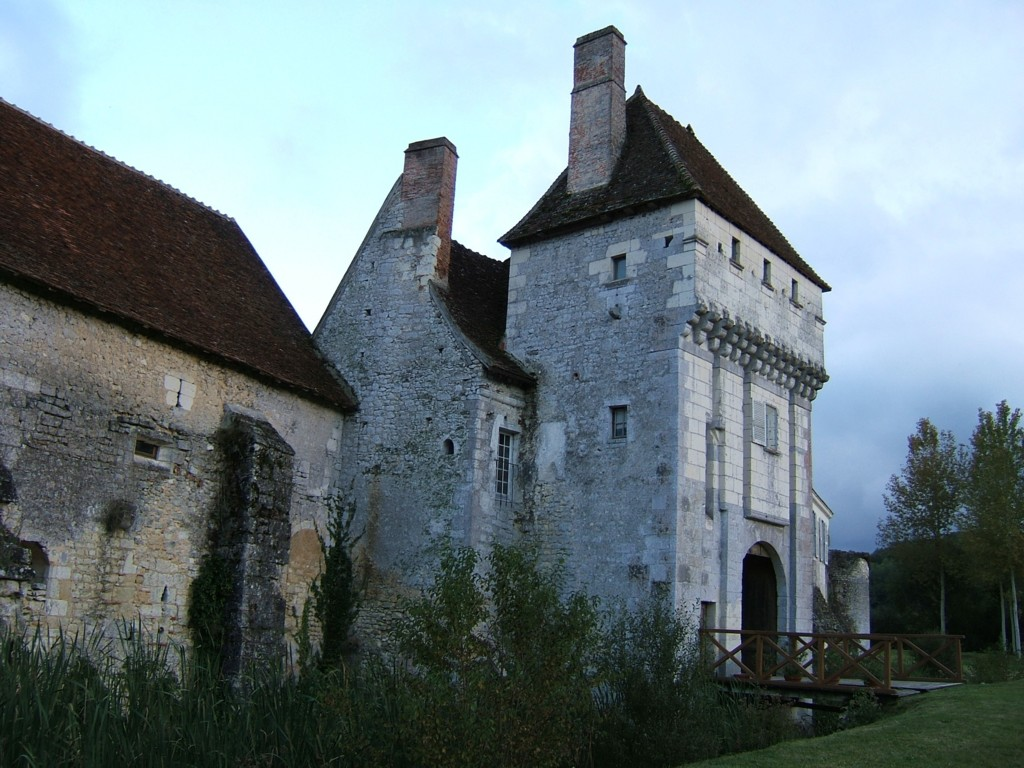
Fortified gate

The fortified gateway was probably built around 1575, during a peaceful period of the Wars of Religion; its style suggests that it dates from the last quarter of the 16th century, as confirmed by the dendrochronological dating of the timbers. The fortified gatehouse replaces the old portcullis against which it is set. It takes the form of a two-story tower with machicolations on the west façade. Access is via two gateways, one for carts and the other for pedestrians, each with a drawbridge over the moat. The masonry is composed of rubble stone, with large tufa blocks placed at the corners, with the exception of the west façade above the doors, where the only material used is tufa. The double-hipped roof is covered with tiles.

Above the doors, the first story houses the machinery for the drawbridges, while the second story, which controls the machicolations, has been converted into a lookout room equipped with the necessary equipment for people – perhaps soldiers from the garrison commissioned to protect the Carthusian monastery. The room features a sink with an external drain through the north wall, topped by an embrasure.

=== The church ===
Church chronology (southern side): First Phase Second Phase Third Phase Fourth Phase Fifth Phase

This is the building that has undergone the most alterations since it was first built, but also the one that has been the most extensively studied. The construction and development of this building took place in five main phases, clearly recognizable from the view of the church from the south, the only façade where its walls are not partially concealed by other buildings.

First Phase: the initial building consists of a two-bay nave, extended to the east by a single-bay choir and a pentagonal apse. The main entrance is located in the western gable wall; two secondary entrances are located in the northern gutter wall, leading to a gallery between the church and the cellar building. It measures 15.50 × 6 m, with a capstone height of 11.50 m. The floor is then backfilled to a height of 1.50 m, both inside and out. The existence of an independent bell tower, or a bell-gable, is suspected but not confirmed; the original roof, certainly tiled, must have been continuous from the nave to the apse. These elements were lost during subsequent alterations. While the exterior masonry is Romanesque, the vaults are typical of the Western Gothic style, and this first phase of construction can be dated to the late-11th or early 13th century. According to Gérard Fleury, the 1206 dedication is a valuable reference, but does not rule out that the work was completed around 1220. Inside, the keystone sculpture, common in the Western Gothic style, is underlined by a still discernible colored decoration, and the intrados of the vaults also features a black-and-white illusion painting, giving the impression of very regular masonry. The church contains a Renaissance baptismal font.

Second Phase: probably in the first half of the 15th century, the nave of the church, above the wall plates, was raised by one story, with ample natural light, and closed off to the east by a wattle and daub wooden frames; the vault of the apse, located below this wall, would probably not support the weight of a masonry wall. The apse is not affected by this remodeling. The function of this floor is unknown, but it may have been used as a dormitory to house the growing number of staff working at La Corroirie. Externally, the restoration work is clearly visible on the southern gutter wall: the original masonry is dressed in tufa stone, while the upper story is made of rubble of various types. An batter was built up against this wall up to the base of the windows, where it altered the tufa facing, certainly to counteract the thrust of the church's upper stories. The exact dates of its installation and removal have not been established.

Third Phase: A new alteration takes place in the second half of the 15th century. The apse was heightened and, like the nave, was transformed into a bastion. The most striking features of this period are the exclamation-point-shaped arrowslits in the apse floor and the south gutter wall, with a vertical sight slit above a round hole for the barrel of a firearm; these murder holes are opened close to the floor of the first story.

Fourth Phase: Another undated alteration, presumably dating from before 1570, involved the construction of a building perpendicular to the previous ones, connecting the cellar floor to the church floor on the western gable, which had previously been demolished.

Fifth Phase: when La Corroirie was transformed into a fortified house in the late 16th century, the only modifications made to the church were the addition of a few arrowslits in the apse to cover the shooting blind spots. These were of a different type to the previous ones, better suited to larger weapons.

=== The prison ===
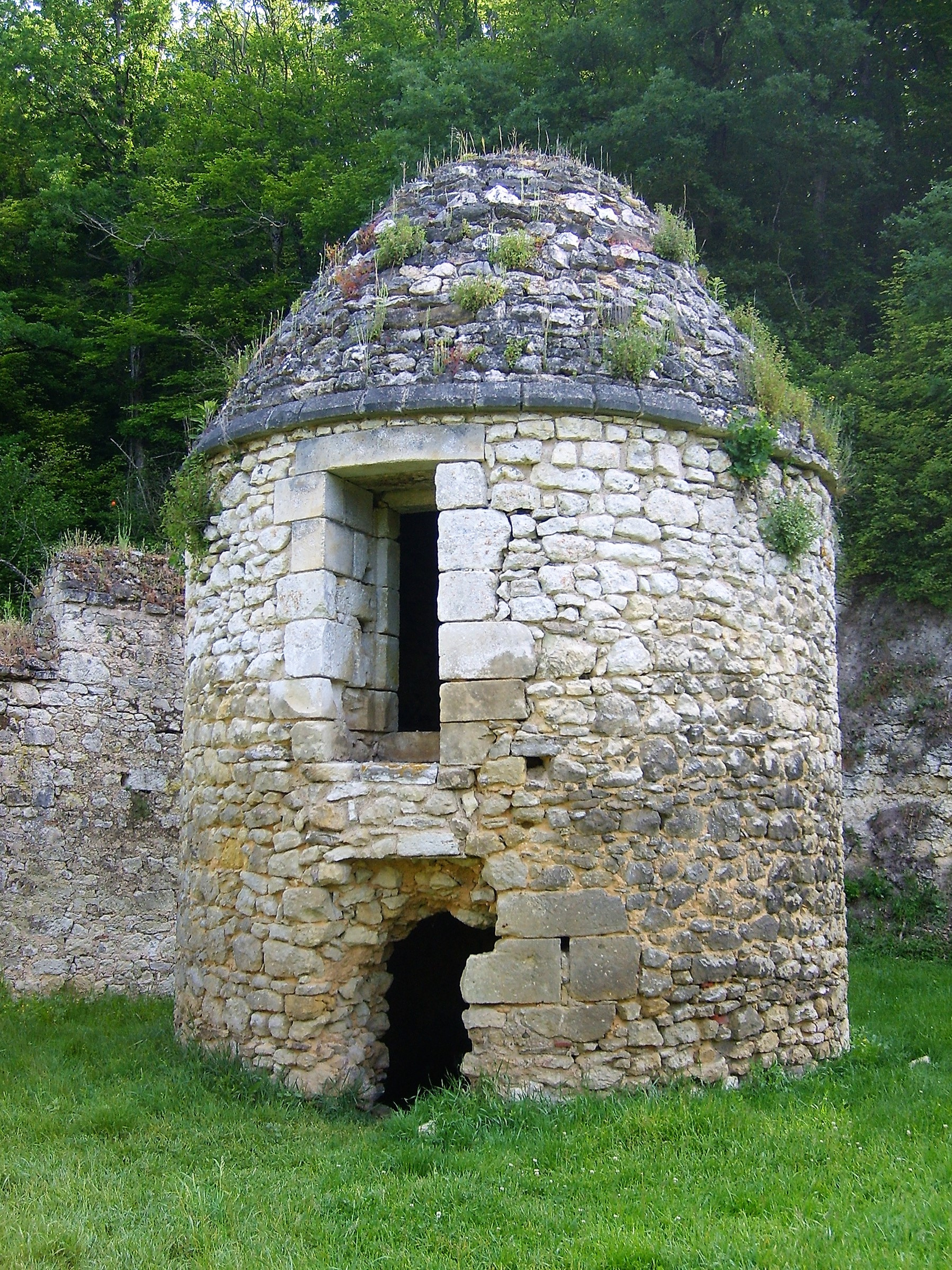
The Prison

A turret, 5 m diameter and 7 m high, covered by a stone dome, isolated in the northern part of the building enclosure, is considered to be a former prison due to its particular layout, even if later alterations render it more difficult to understand. Two interconnected cells, one on top of the other, measure approximately 2.70 m in diameter and 2.90 m (first floor) and 3.65 m (upper floor) in interior height. A single door on the upper floor can only be closed from the outside – only this door remains original; the opening at the base of the building is a late addition – latrines are built into the wall of each cell, and the external openings (arrowslits, bays) are small and originally fitted with double internal and external bars.

The hypothesis that this tower could have served as an ice-house does not stand up well to analysis: the layout of the rooms does not suggest such a purpose. The possibility of a prison built in the second half of the 16th century remains the most plausible. However, it's not unlikely that the building also served as a hemp processing furnace between the periods in which it was occupied by prisoners, or at a later date, as hemp production is well documented in this part of Touraine.

=== Other buildings and structures ===
North of the church, a vast building serves as a cellar. Initially built at the same time as, or shortly after, the church, it consists of two five-bay aisles. On its west façade, it reuses the substructions of an earlier wall. It was redesigned and enlarged -its entrances were moved upstairs, first to the west, then to the east, on the same level as the hillside-, raised several times and attached to the upper floor of the church. In the second half of the 17th century, two flour mills were built on its eastern side, and were still in operation as late as 1835. Around 1740, the millstones were moved upstairs and, to compensate for this transfer of loads to the building, the diameter of the pillars occupying the center of the first floor was greatly increased. The driving wheels of these watermills were fed by a canal originating from the Corroirie pond, which runs along the foot of the hillside to the east of the site; in modern times, it was filled in. The building's upper floors, probably unstable or weakened by successive alterations, have disappeared.

A large building was erected to the west of the site towards the end of the 13th century. North-south oriented, it may initially have served as a chapter house for the brothers or as a court, but there's no conclusive information. Altered several times, it may have been partially converted into a garrison dwelling when La Corroirie was fortified. It was at this time that the western façade was fitted with buttresses. In the 14th century, the northern part of the building was significantly modified. It was transformed into a gatehouse, and access to La Corroirie was gained through a fortified gateway with a portcullis. It may have seemed simpler to the builders to take advantage of existing buildings to create this gateway, rather than constructing it from scratch on the south side of the enclosure, where the abbey gate had stood until then. Before the French Revolution, this building underwent a major modification: it was raised slightly and floors were added, dividing it into several stories, which were later partitioned into rooms.

In the northern extension of the gatehouse, a building considered to be the monks' refectory was one of the first to be constructed. It was later extensively rebuilt and raised, presumably to accommodate visiting guests.

Further to the north, perpendicular to the previous building, stands a two-story structure, the role of which has not been confirmed. This may have been the abbey's outbuildings, topped by the abbot's dwelling. Its construction dates back to the first half of the 15th century, when the church was heightened.

Two towers remain from the period when La Corroirie was transformed into a fortified house. The tower to the north of the outbuildings has been reduced to ruins, but was still standing in 1897; the tower to the south of the west hall has held up considerably better.

After the Wars of Religion, the abbey's enclosure was extended to the north and east, where it encompassed part of the hillside. However, its defensive capacity was limited, especially as the security of La Corroirie on its flank was guaranteed by the presence of the steep hillside, which had to be reinforced by a wall with buttresses. This feature is still clearly visible to the north of the preserved buildings, near the prison.

An underground passage, dug into the hillside and perhaps connected to the east gable of the cellar, has a large room and several passageways, one of which leads to the open air on the northern side of the buildings. It was explored by the Spéléo-club de Touraine in 2009. However, there is no evidence to suggest that this was the underground passageway used by the monks of the Carthusian monastery to take refuge at La Corroirie in 1361.

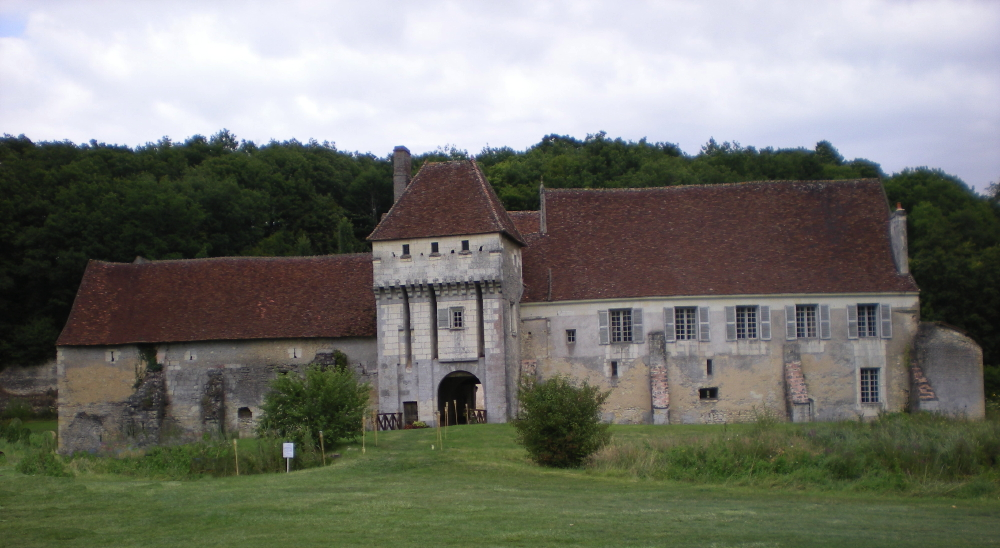
West facade of La Corroirie: from left to right, refectory (?), portery, chapter house (?) and southern tower.

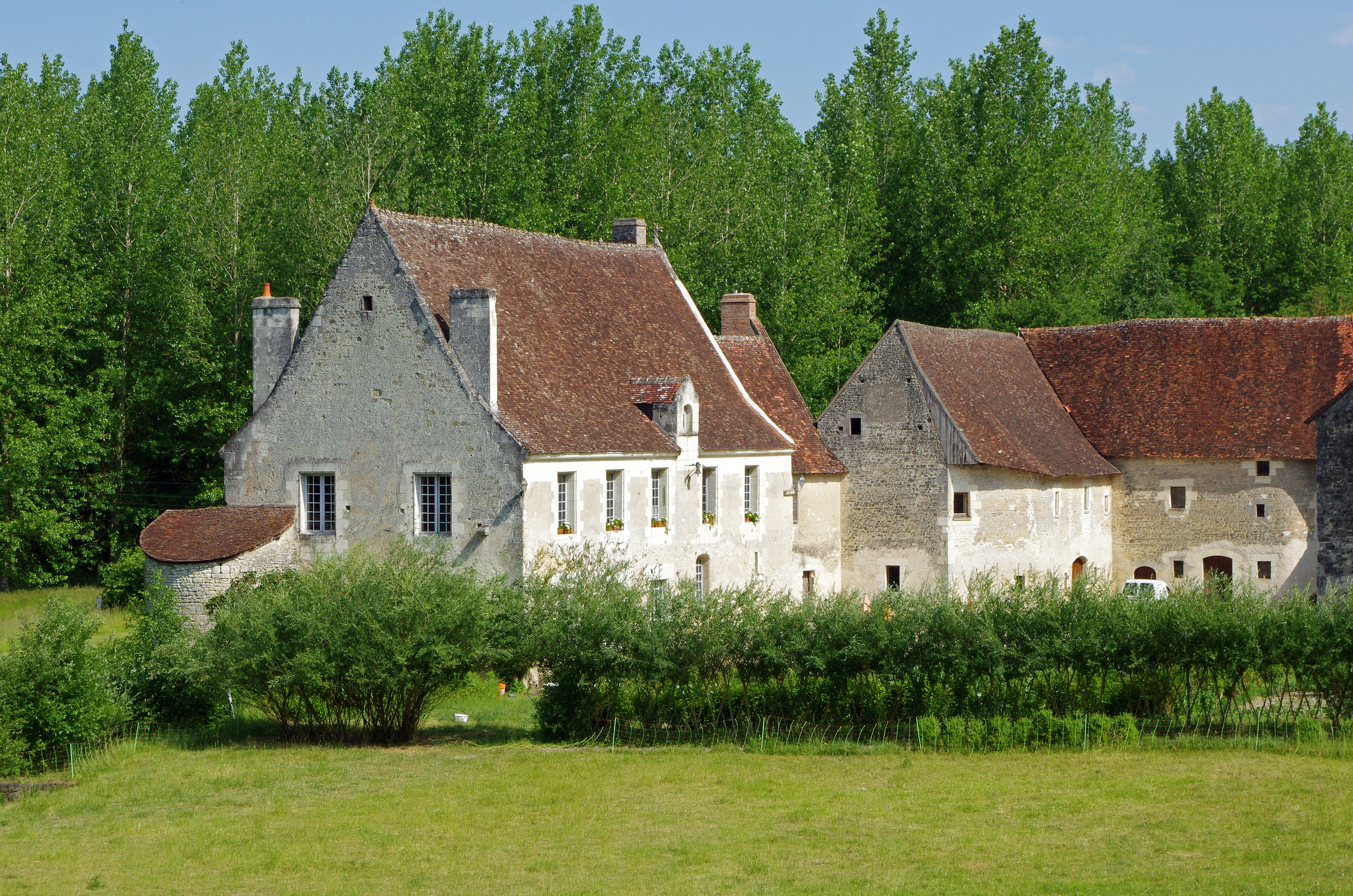
In the background, refectory (?) and angled common rooms in the corner.

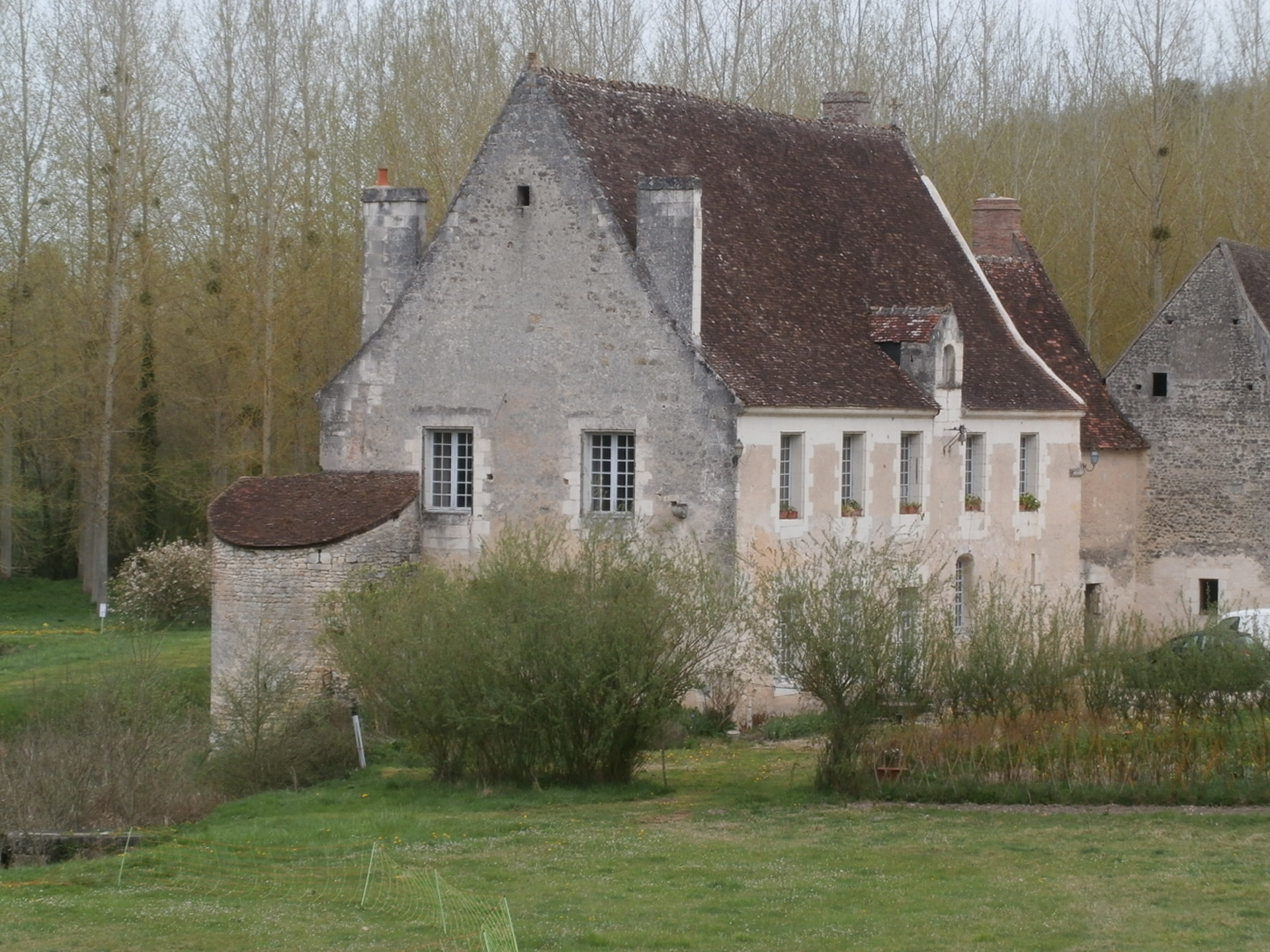
Chapter house (?) and southern tower.

== La Corroirie in the arts and culture ==
The short film Les Condiments irréguliers, loosely based on the life of the Marquise de Brinvilliers, was partly shot at La Corroirie in 2009.

In 2015, La Corroirie was the setting for several scenes – including the burning at the stake – in the American film Joan of Arc, retracing the life of Joan of Arc.

Several episodes of Mary Play-Parlange's crime novel Clair-obscur en chartreuse: une enquête à tiroirs (2013) are set at La Corroirie or evoke historical events that took place there.

== Architectural and historical studies ==
There are few studies devoted specifically, or in large part, to the Corroirie region.

In 1897, Louis-Auguste Bossebœuf recounts an excursion made by members of the Société archéologique de Touraine (SAT) to the Lochois region; he devotes a few pages of this publication to a brief evocation of the history and description of the Corroirie's main buildings.

In 1934, Albert Philippon wrote an historical study of the Chartreuse du Liget, published in two issues of the Bulletin de la société archéologique de Touraine. The first part was devoted to the upper house, the second to La Corroirie and Saint-Jean du Liget chapel.

In 2000, Gérard Fleury carried out a detailed architectural study of the church and cellars at La Corrioirie, providing a more precise chronology for the construction of these buildings. The study was published in the Bulletin des amis du pays lochois. In 2007, Christophe Meunier published a book devoted to the Chartreuse du Liget. In a chronological presentation of the monastery's history, several passages deal specifically with the Corroirie.

In the late 2000s, as part of the building's restoration work undertaken by the owners, a multi-disciplinary working group undertook a historical and archaeological study of the entire Corroirie site. The results were published in the Revue archéologique du center de la France.

== See also ==
- Carthusians
- Société archéologique de Touraine

== Bibliography ==
=== Publications devoted exclusively to Corroi du Liget ===
- Jean-Baptiste Bellon, Reconversion d'une ferme fortifiée : la Corroirie en Touraine : Mémoire de diplôme d'architecture, Paris, Ecole l'architecture de Paris-La Défense, 1985, 101 p.
- Bruno Dufaÿ, "La Corroirie de la Chartreuse du Liget à Chemillé-sur-Indrois (Indre-et-Loire). Étude historique et architecturale", Revue archéologique du centre de la France, FERACF, t. 53, 2014 (read online archive [PDF]). .
- Gérard Fleury, "L'église de la Corroirie du Liget", Bulletin de la Société des amis du pays lochois, n^{o} 25, 2010, p. 65–82.
- Gérard Fleury, "La chartreuse et la Corroirie", Bulletin de la Société des amis du pays lochois, n^{o} 26, 2011, p. 91–96.
- Jeff de Mareuil, "La chartreuse et la Corroirie", Bulletin de la Société des amis du pays lochois, n^{o} 19, 2004, p. 9–16.
- Albert Philippon, "La chartreuse du Liget (suite)", Bulletin de la Société archéologique de Touraine, t. XXV, 1934, p. 289–342 (ISSN 1153-2521, read online archive).

=== Other publications ===
- Jacques-Xavier Carré de Busserolle, Dictionnaire géographique, historique et biographique d'Indre-et-Loire et de l'ancienne province de Touraine, t. IV, Société archéologique de Touraine, 1882, 430 p. (read online archive), p. 53–59.
- Christophe Meunier, La chartreuse du Liget, Chemillé-sur-Indrois, Hugues de Chivré, 2007, 172 p. ISBN 978-2-916043-15-9
