= Chemillé-sur-Indrois =

- Commune
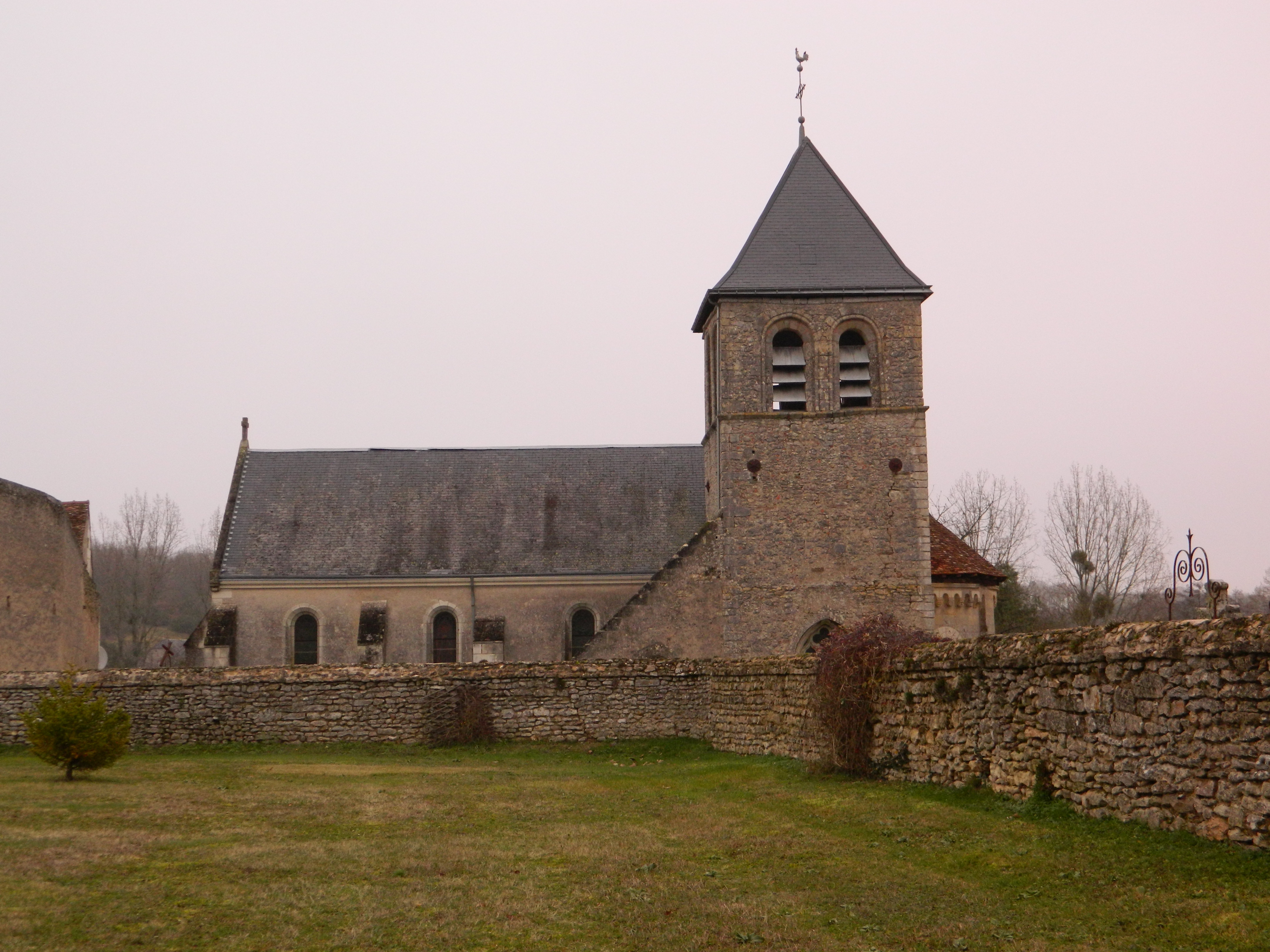
- The parish church of St. Vincent, Chemillé-sur-Indrois
- Location of Chemillé-sur-Indrois
- Location within France Location within Centre-Val de Loire
- Coordinates: 47°09′42″N 1°10′00″E
- Country: France
- Region: Centre-Val de Loire
- Department: Indre-et-Loire
- Arrondissement: Loches
- Canton: Loches
- Intercommunality: CC Loches Sud Touraine

Government
  - Mayor (2020–2026): Étienne Arnould
- Area^{1}: 24.87 km^{2} (9.60 sq mi)
- Highest elevation: 142 m (466 ft)
- Lowest elevation: 82 m (269 ft)
- Population (2023): 227
  - Density: 9.13/km^{2} (23.6/sq mi)
- Time zone: UTC+01:00 (CET)
  - Summer (DST): UTC+02:00 (CEST)
- INSEE/Postal code: 37069 /37460
- ^{1} French Land Register data, which excludes lakes, ponds, glaciers > 1 km^{2} (0.386 sq mi or 247 acres) and river estuaries.

Chemillé-sur-Indrois (French pronunciation: [ʃəmije syʁ ɛ̃dʁwa], literally Chemillé on Indrois) is a commune in the Indre-et-Loire department, central France.

== Geography ==
The Indrois flows west through the commune and crosses the village.

== Population ==
Historical population
Year	Pop.	±% p.a.
1968	339	—
1975	273	−3.05%
1982	250	−1.25%
1990	207	−2.33%
1999	197	−0.55%
2007	215	+1.10%
2012	217	+0.19%
2017	222	+0.46%
2023	227	+0.37%
Source: INSEE

== See also ==
- Communes of the Indre-et-Loire department
- Corroirie
