= Centre-Val de Loire =

Administrative region of France

Coordinates: 47°30′N 1°45′E

- Region
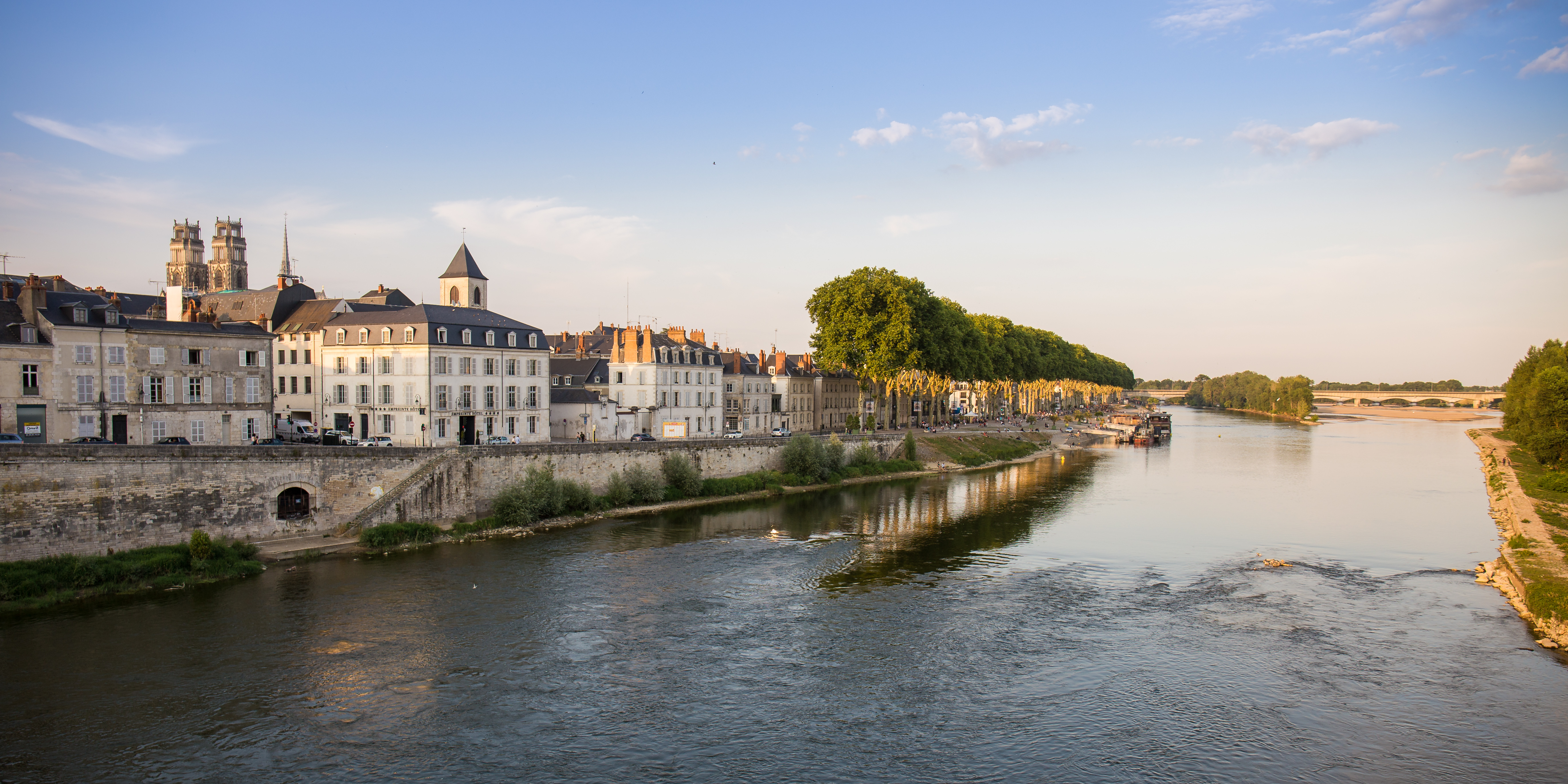
- The Loire river as it passes through Orléans

- Brandmark

- Country: France
- Prefecture: Orléans
- Departments: 6: Cher (18); Eure-et-Loir (28); Indre (36); Indre-et-Loire (37); Loir-et-Cher (41); Loiret (45)

Government
  - President of the Regional Council: François Bonneau (PS)

Area
  - Total: 39,151 km^{2} (15,116 sq mi)
  - Rank: 7th

Population (2023)
  - Total: 2,587,031
  - Density: 66.078/km^{2} (171.14/sq mi)

GDP
  - Total: €91.467 billion (2024)
  - Per capita: €35,343 (2024)
- Time zone: UTC+01:00 (CET)
  - Summer (DST): UTC+02:00 (CEST)
- ISO 3166 code: FR-CVL
- NUTS Region: FR2
- Largest city: Tours
- Website: www.centre-valdeloire.fr

Centre-Val de Loire (/ˌvæl də ˈlwɑːr, ˌvɑːl-/; French pronunciation: [sɑ̃tʁ(ə) val də lwaʁ], lit. 'Centre-Loire Valley'), or simply Centre as it was known until 2015, is one of the eighteen administrative regions of France and one of five without a coastline. It straddles the middle Loire Valley in the interior of the country, encompassing six departments (Cher, Eure-et-Loir, Indre, Indre-et-Loire, Loir-et-Cher and Loiret), with a population of 2,572,853 as of 2018. Its prefecture is Orléans, and its largest city is Tours.

== Naming and etymology ==
Logo used until 2015

Like many current regions of France, the region of Centre-Val de Loire was created from parts of historical provinces: Touraine, Orléanais and Berry. First, the name Centre was chosen by the government purely on the basis of geography, in reference to its location in northwest-central France (the central part of the original French language area). The name was criticised as being too dull and undistinguished. Proposed names for the region included Val de Loire after the Loire Valley (a principal feature of the region) or Cœur de Loire (Heart of Loire). On 17 January 2015, as part of the reorganisation of French regions, the region's official name was changed to Centre-Val de Loire. A new logo was also created for the region.

== Geography ==
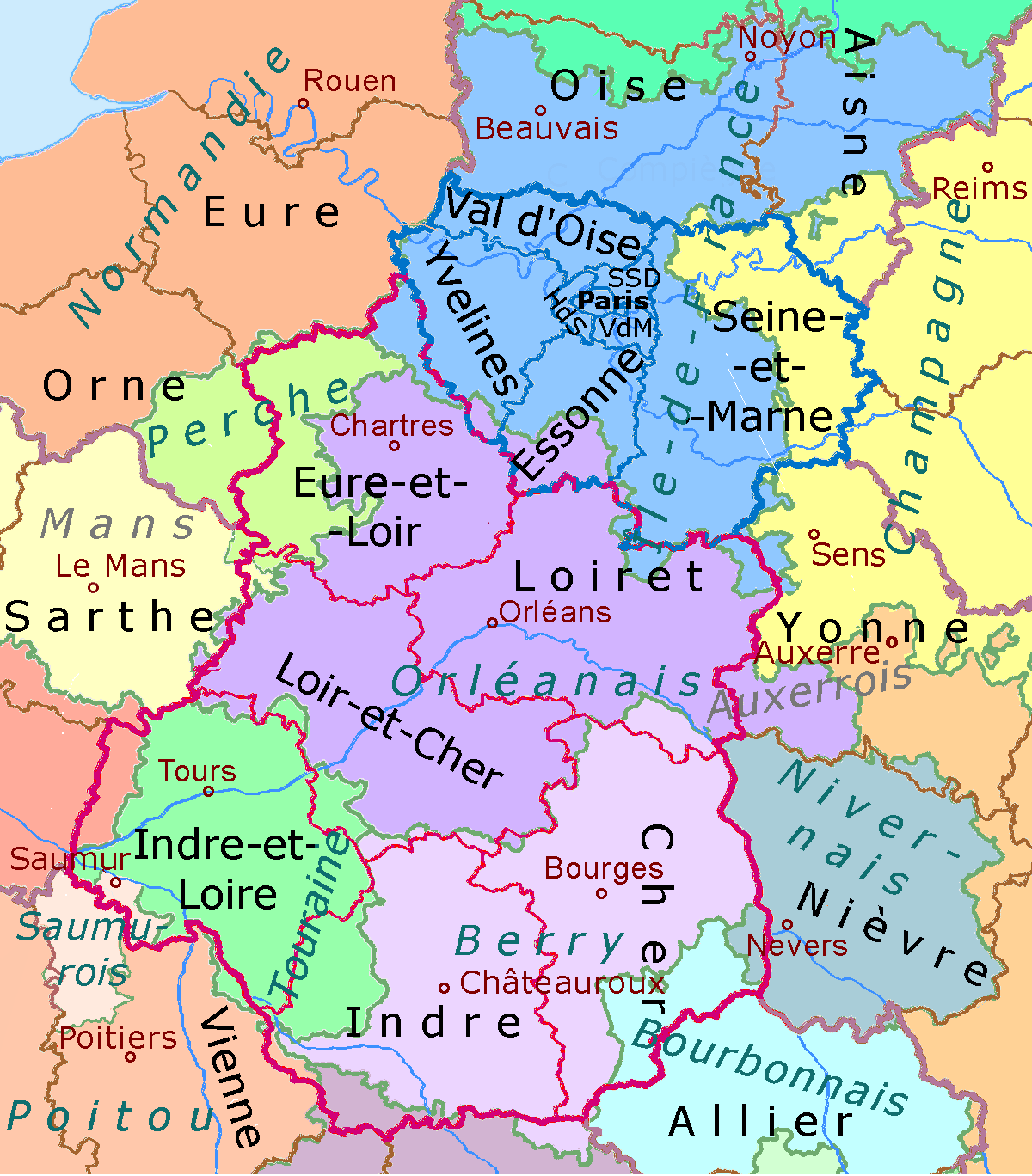
The regions Centre-Val de Loire and Île-de-France and their departments on the background of historical provinces

Bordering six out of eighteen, Centre-Val-de-Loire is the region that has the highest number of shared borders with other French regions. The adjacent regions are Normandy to the northwest, Île-de-France to the northeast, Bourgogne-Franche-Comté to the east, Auvergne-Rhône-Alpes to the southeast, Nouvelle-Aquitaine to the southwest and Pays de la Loire to the west.

=== Departments ===
Centre-Val de Loire comprises six departments: Cher, Eure-et-Loir, Indre, Indre-et-Loire, Loir-et-Cher, and Loiret.

=== Largest cities ===
- Tours with 136,463 inhabitants (2018)
- Orléans with 116,238 inhabitants (2018)
- Bourges with 64,668 inhabitants (2018)
- Blois with 45,871 inhabitants (2018)
- Châteauroux with 43,442 inhabitants (2018)
- Chartres with 38,426 inhabitants (2018)
- Joué-lès-Tours with 38,250 inhabitants (2018), Tours Métropole Val de Loire
- Dreux with 30,664 inhabitants (2018)
- Vierzon with 25,725 inhabitants (2018)
- Olivet with 22,168 inhabitants (2018), Orléans Métropole

== Economy ==
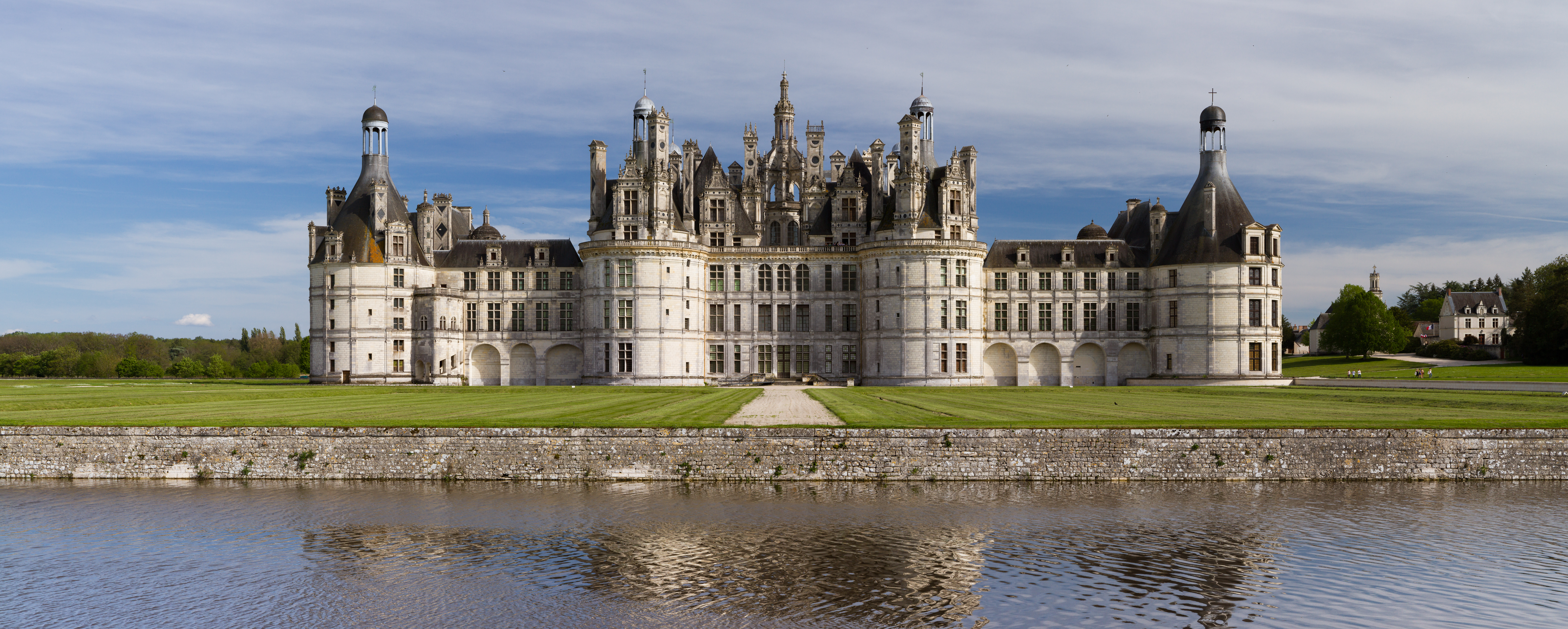
Château de Chambord

The gross domestic product (GDP) of the region was 72.4 billion euros in 2018, accounting for 3.1% of French economic output. GDP per capita adjusted for purchasing power was 25,200 euros or 84% of the EU27 average in the same year. The GDP per employee was 99% of the EU average.

An economic development agency, called Centréco, was created in 1994 by the Regional Council of Centre to promote the inflow of investments and the establishment of new businesses by French and foreign companies in the Centre region. This contributes to a mission of economic promotion, international support to regional companies, and the promotion of regional agrofood products via a regional signature, du Centre.

== Transport ==
Tours Val de Loire Airport is the only airport in the region that provides limited flights to some destinations. However, the region would normally uses Paris's Charles de Gaulle Airport as it provides more domestic and international destinations. It is accessible by train which takes an hour and 40 minutes from Tours.

== Gallery ==
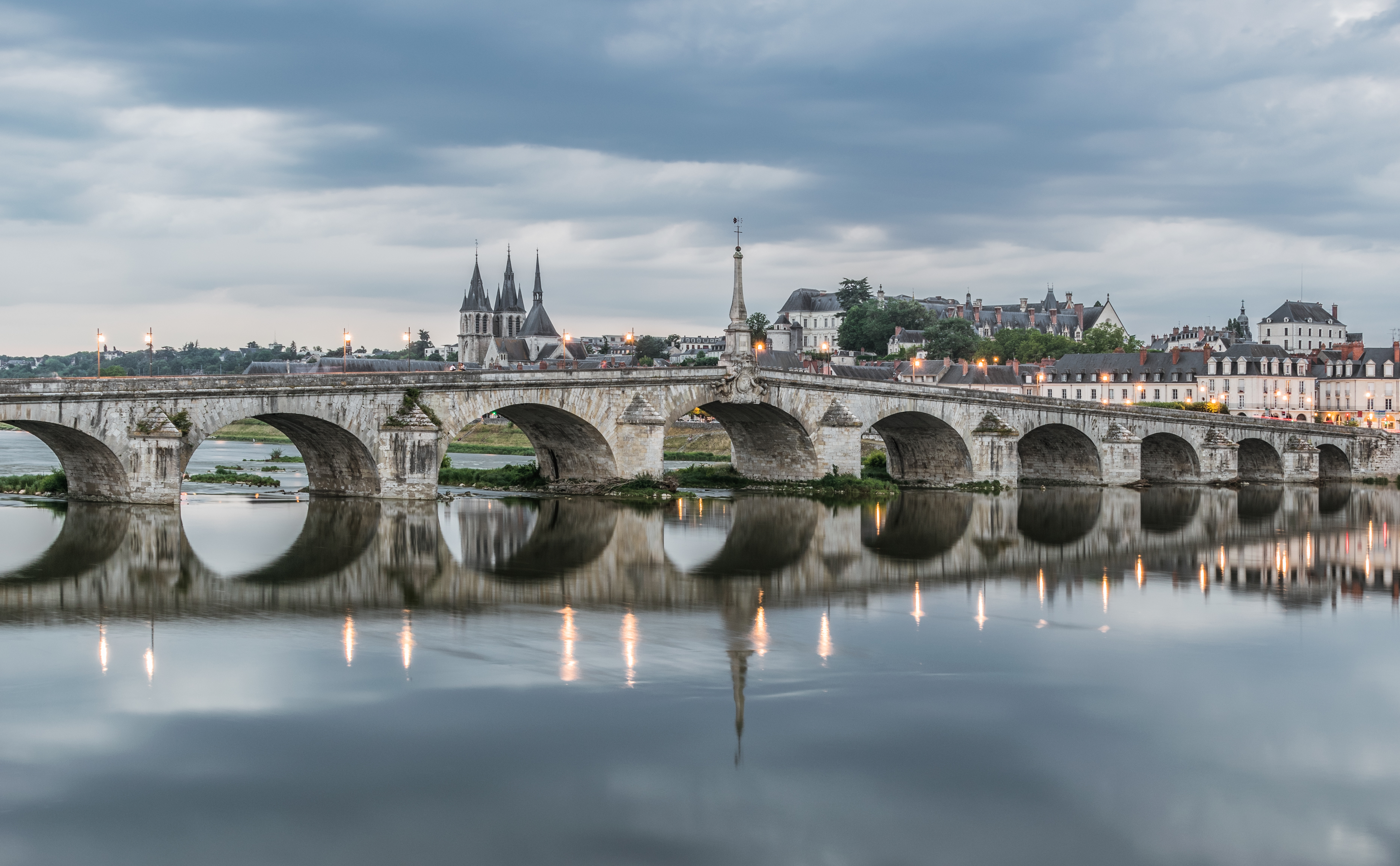
Blois

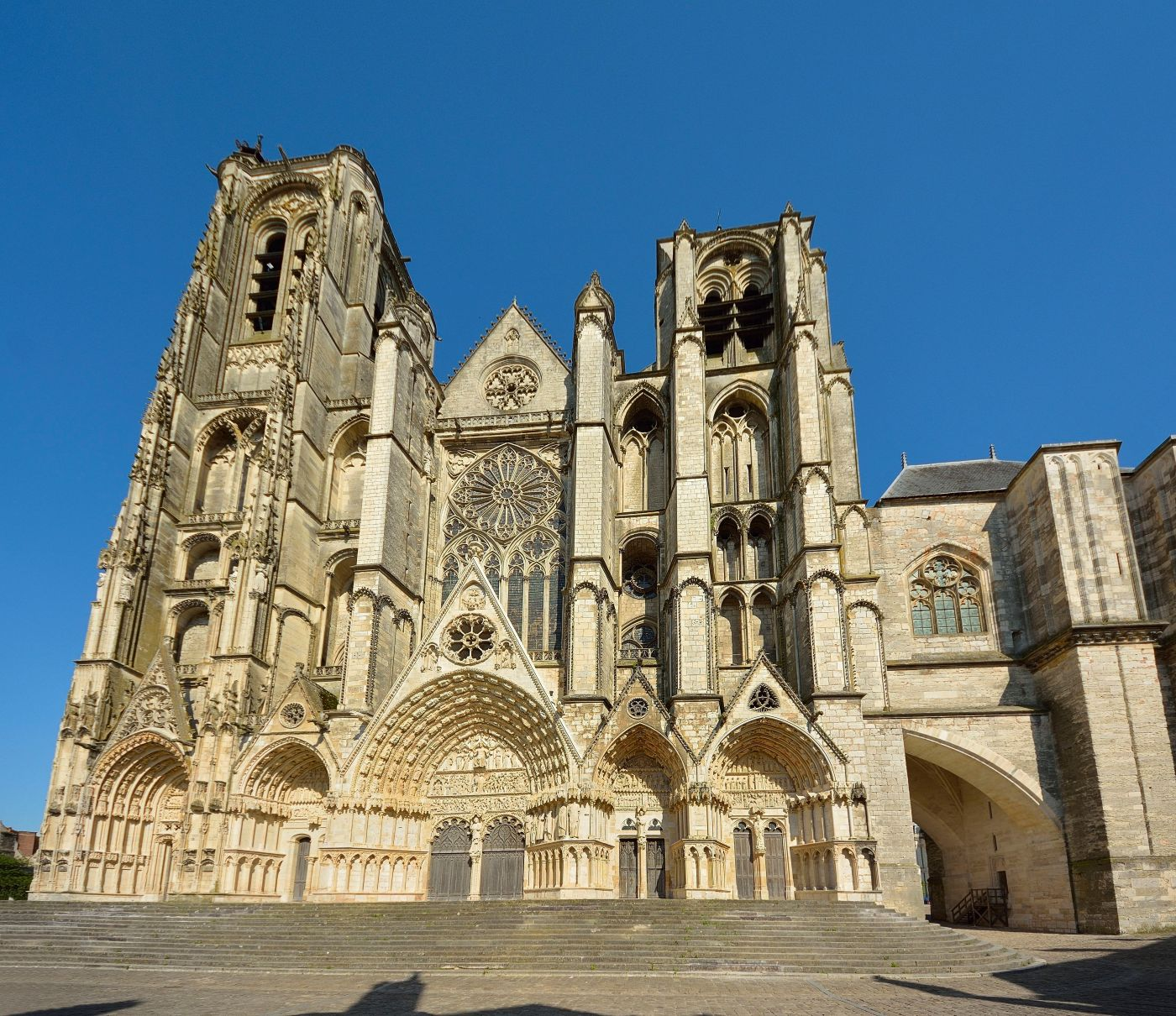
Bourges

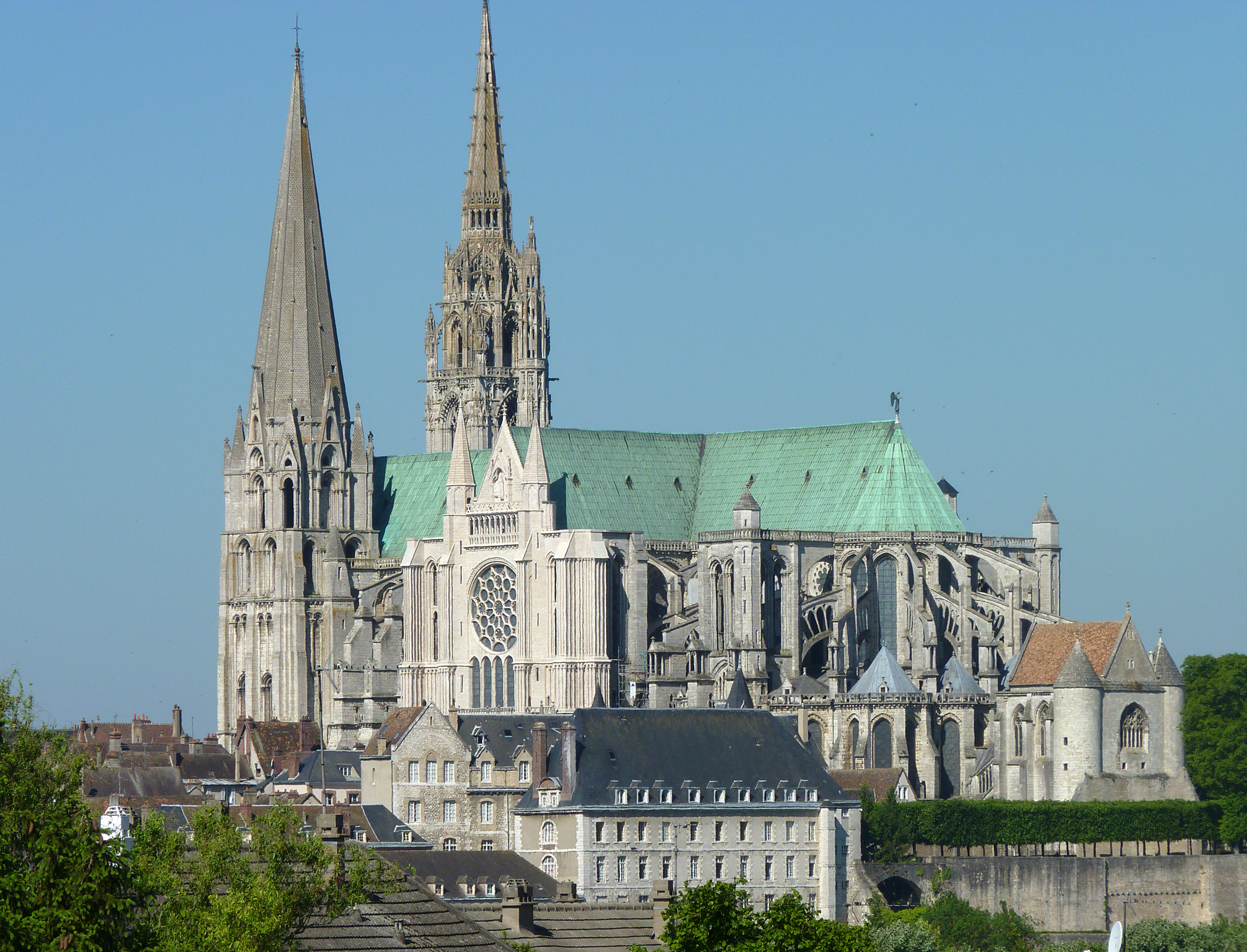
Chartres

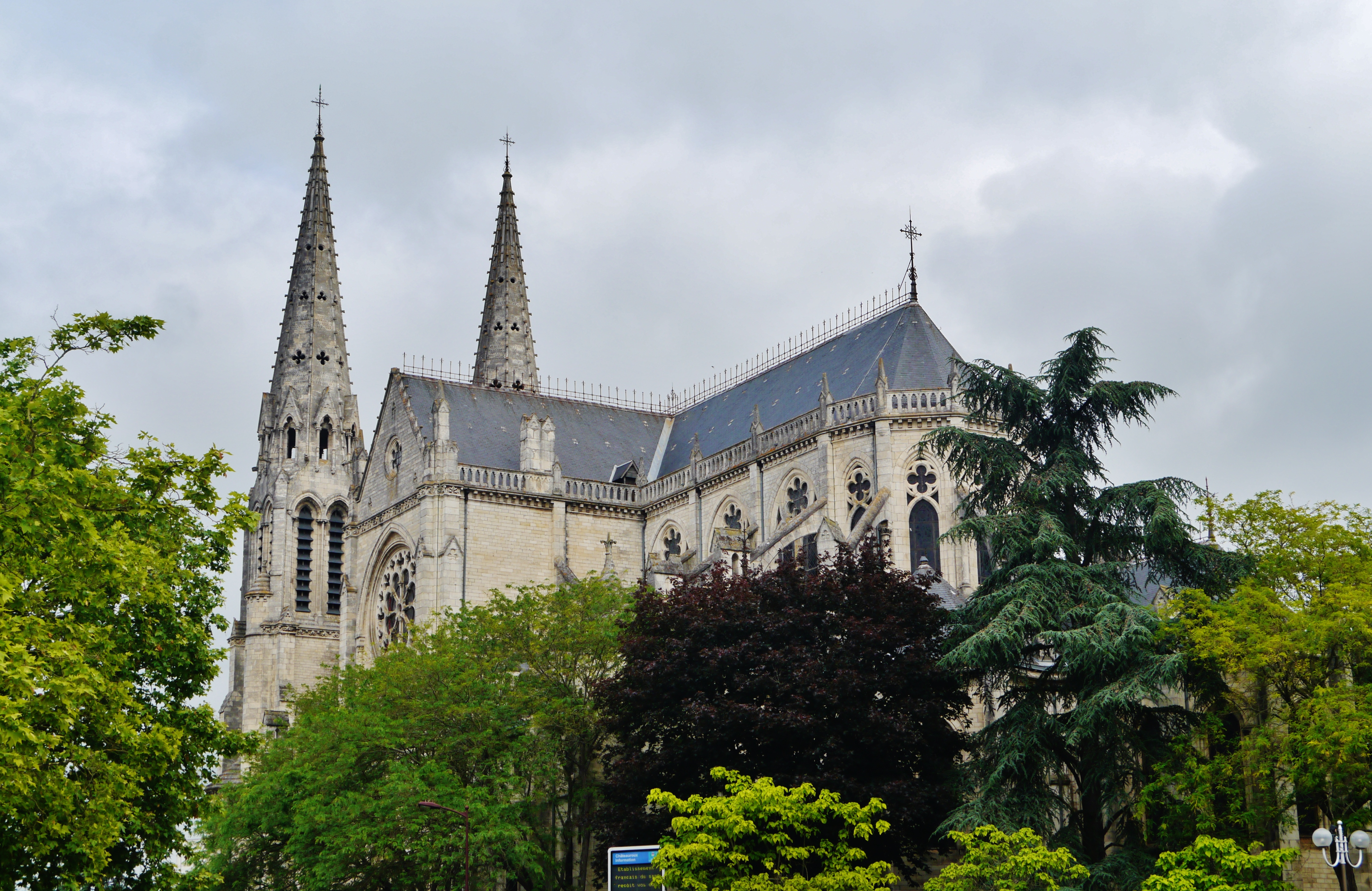
Châteauroux

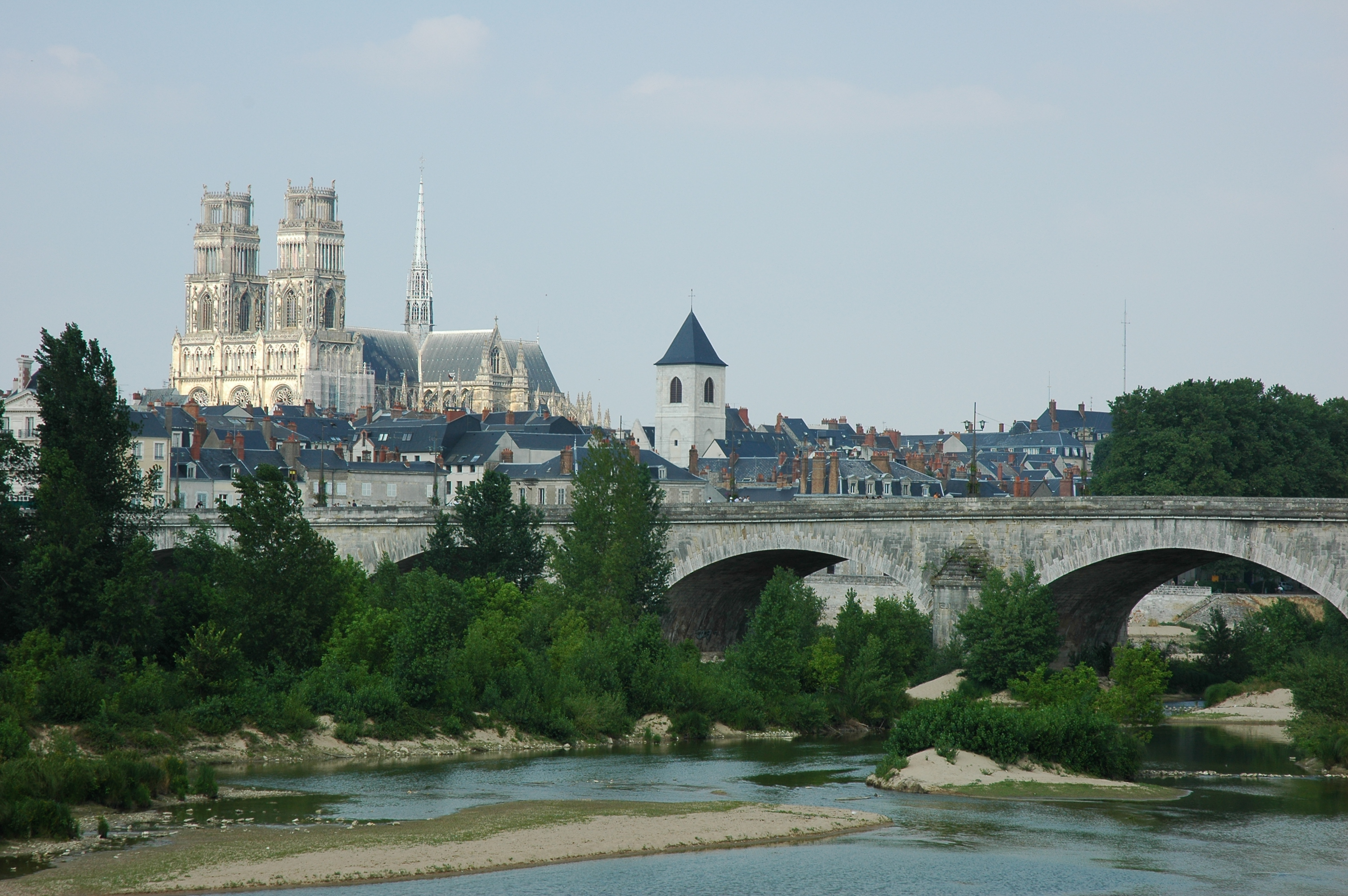
Orléans

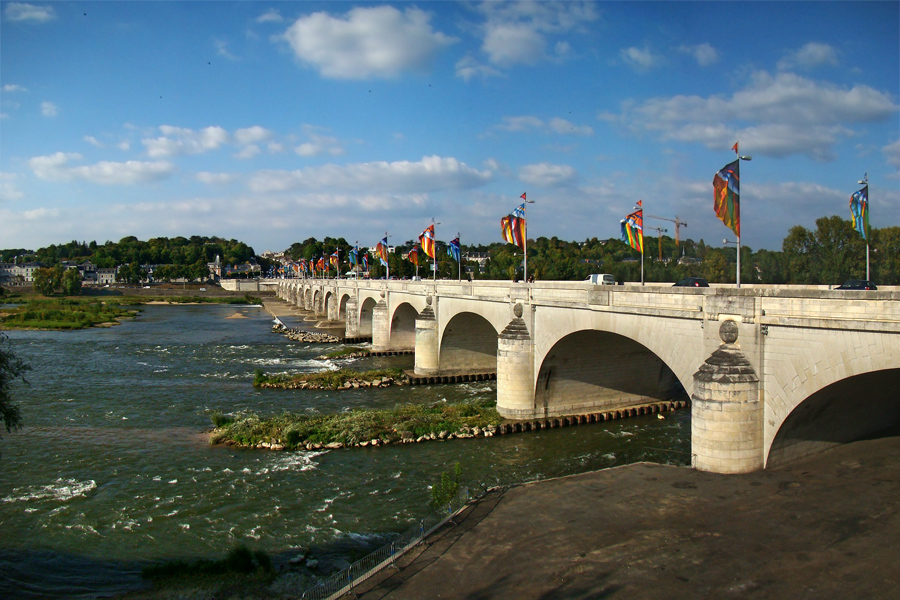
Tours

== See also ==
- Apremont-sur-Allier
- Gargilesse-Dampierre
- Lavardin
- Montrésor
- Saint-Benoît-du-Sault
- Corroirie
- Louroux Priory
- Beaujardin
