= Bruno of Cologne =

Founder of the Carthusians (c. 1030–1101)

Saint Bruno of Cologne OCart
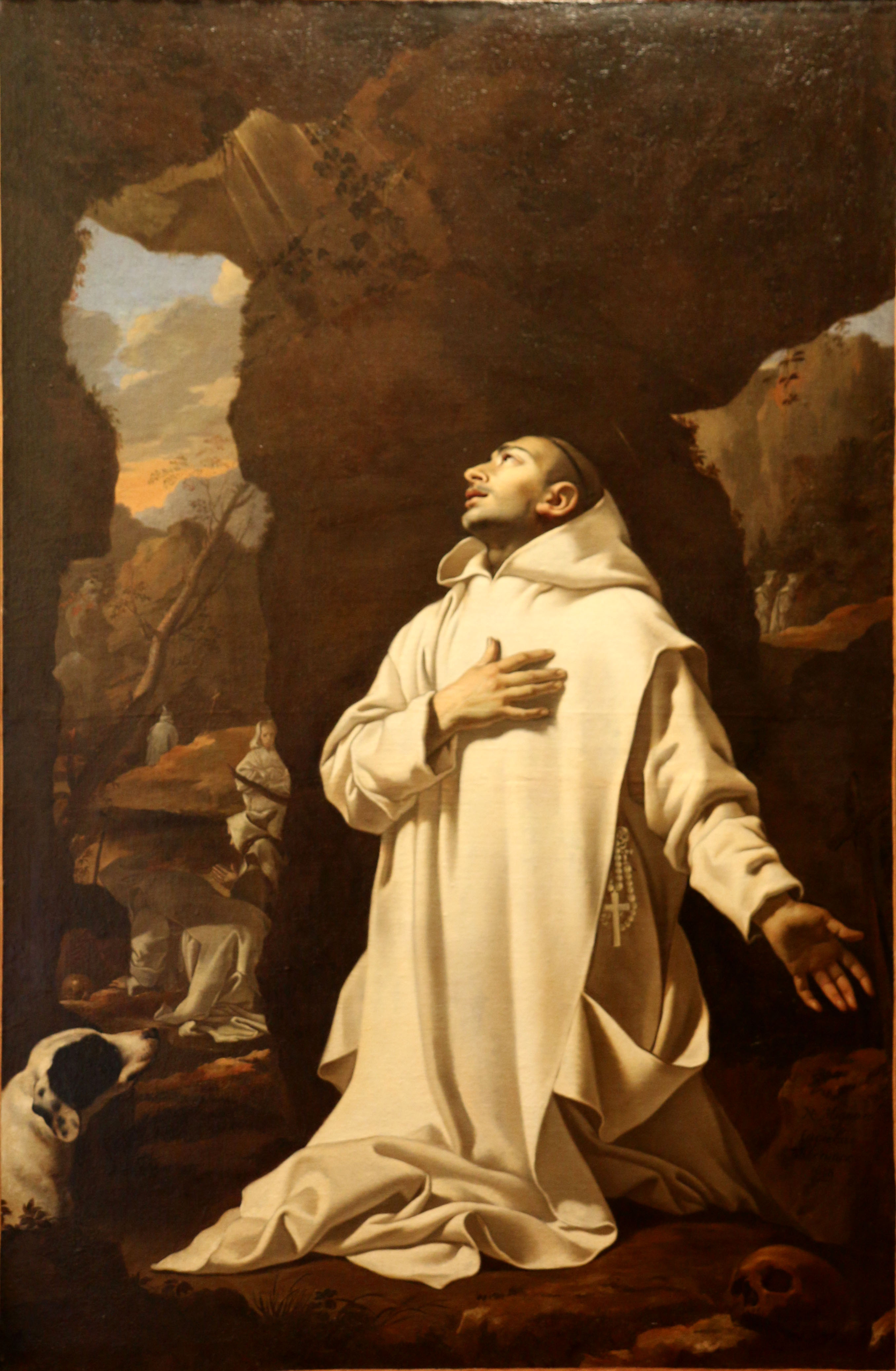
- Saint Bruno of Cologne, by Nicolas Mignard

Monk, Hermit, Confessor
- Born: c. 1030; Cologne, Archdiocese of Cologne
- Died: 6 October 1101; Serra San Bruno
- Venerated in: Catholic Church
- Beatified: 1514 by Pope Leo X
- Canonized: 17 February 1623 by Pope Gregory XV
- Feast: 6 October
- Attributes: Carthusian habit, holding a skull, rule of the Carthusian order, crucifix

Bruno of Cologne OCart (German: Bruno von Köln; Italian: Bruno di Colonia; c. 1030 – 6 October 1101), venerated as Saint Bruno, was a German Catholic monk who founded the Carthusians. He personally started the order's first two monasteries. He was also a celebrated teacher at Reims and a close advisor of his former pupil, Pope Urban II. His feast day is 6 October.

== Life ==
Bruno was born in Cologne about the year 1030. According to tradition, he belonged to the family of Hartenfaust, or Hardebüst, one of the principal families of the city. Little is known of his early years, except that he studied theology in the present-day French city of Reims before returning to his native land.

His education completed, Bruno returned to Cologne, where he was most likely ordained a priest around 1055 and provided with a canonry at St. Cunibert's. In 1056, Bishop Gervais recalled him to Reims, where the following year he found himself head of the episcopal school, which at the time included the direction of the schools and the oversight of all the educational establishments of the diocese. For eighteen years, from 1057 to 1075, he maintained the prestige which the school of Reims attained under its former masters, Remi of Auxerre, and others.

Bruno led the school for nearly two decades, acquiring an excellent reputation as a philosopher and theologian. Among his students were Eudes of Châtillon, afterwards Pope Urban II, Rangier, Cardinal and Bishop of Reggio, Robert, Bishop of Langres, and a large number of prelates and abbots.

== Chancellor of the Diocese of Reims ==
In 1075, Bruno was appointed chancellor of the Archdiocese of Reims, which involved him in the daily administration of the diocese. Meanwhile, the pious Bishop Gervais de Château-du-Loir, a friend to Bruno, had been succeeded by Manasses de Gournai, a violent aristocrat with no real vocation for the Church. In 1077, at the urging of Bruno and the clergy at Reims, de Gournai was suspended at a council at Autun. Manasses responded, in typical eleventh-century fashion, by having his retainers pull down the houses of his accusers. He confiscated their goods, sold their benefices, and even appealed to the pope. Bruno discreetly avoided the cathedral city until, in 1080, a definite sentence, confirmed by popular riot, compelled Manasses to withdraw and take refuge with Henry IV, Holy Roman Emperor, the fierce opponent of Pope Gregory VII.

== Founding the Carthusians ==
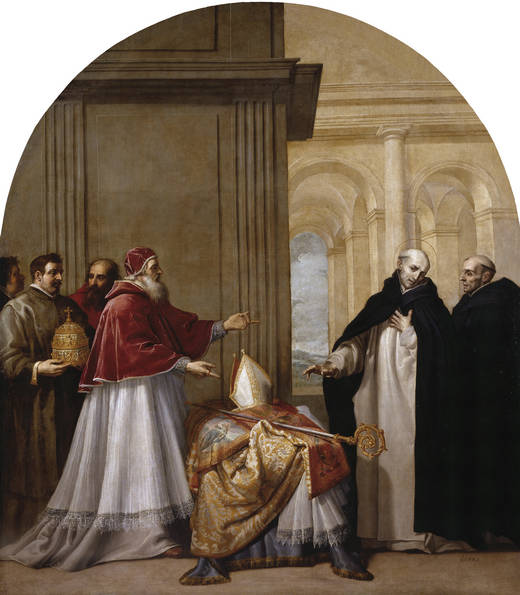
Saint Bruno refuses the archbishopric of Reggio di Calabria, by Vincenzo Carducci, Chartreuse of el Paular.

On the verge of being made bishop himself, Bruno instead followed a vow he had made to renounce secular concerns and withdrew, along with two of his friends, Raoul and Fulcius, also canons of Reims.

Bruno and his companions spent time in religious community with Robert of Molesme, who had in 1075 settled at Sèche-Fontaine, near Molesme in the Diocese of Langres, together with other hermits who would become the first Cistercians in 1098. After a short stay, Bruno went with six of his companions to Hugh of Châteauneuf, Bishop of Grenoble. The bishop installed them in 1084 in a mountainous and uninhabited spot in the lower Alps of the Dauphiné, in a place named Chartreuse, not far from Grenoble. These nascent Carthusians built an oratory with small individual cells at a distance from each other where they lived isolated and in poverty.

At the time, Bruno's pupil, Eudes of Châtillon, had become pope as Urban II (1088). Resolved to continue the work of reform commenced by Gregory VII and being obliged to struggle against Antipope Clement III and Emperor Henry IV, he was in dire need of competent and devoted allies and called his former master to Rome in 1090.

== Life in Italy ==
It is difficult to place the assignment or influence Bruno had in Rome. Lodged in the Lateran with the pope himself, privy to his most private councils, he worked as an advisor but kept to the background, apart from the fiercely partisan rivalries in Rome and within the curia. Shortly after his arrival in Rome, the papal party was forced to evacuate to the south by the arrival of Henry IV with his own antipope in tow.

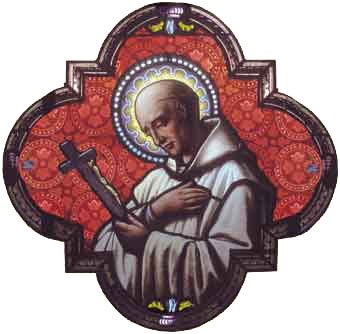
Bruno of Cologne

Bruno resisted efforts to name him Archbishop of Reggio Calabria, deferring instead in favour of one of his former pupils nearby in a Benedictine abbey near Salerno. Instead, Bruno begged to return again to his solitary life. His intention was to rejoin his brethren in Dauphiné, as a letter addressed to them makes clear. However, the will of Urban II kept him in Italy, near the papal court, to which he could be called at need.

Bruno did not attend the Council of Clermont, where Urban preached the First Crusade, but seems to have been present at the Council of Benevento (March 1091). His part in history is effaced.

The place for his new retreat, chosen in 1091 by Bruno and some followers who had joined him, was in the Diocese of Squillace, in a small forested high valley, where the band constructed a little wooden chapel and cabins. His patron there was Roger I of Sicily, Count of Sicily and Calabria and uncle of the Duke of Apulia, who granted them the lands they occupied, and a close friendship developed. Bruno went to the Guiscard court at Mileto to visit the count in his sickness (1098 and 1101), and to baptise his son, Roger (1097), the future King of Sicily. But more often, Roger went into retreat with his friends, where he erected a simple house for himself. Through his generosity, the monastery of St. Stephen was built in 1095, near the original hermitage dedicated to the Virgin.

At the turn of the new century, the friends of Bruno died one after the other: Urban II in 1099; Landuin, the prior of the Grande Chartreuse, his first companion, in 1100; Count Roger in 1101. Bruno followed on 6 October 1101 in Serra San Bruno.

== Bruno's legacy ==
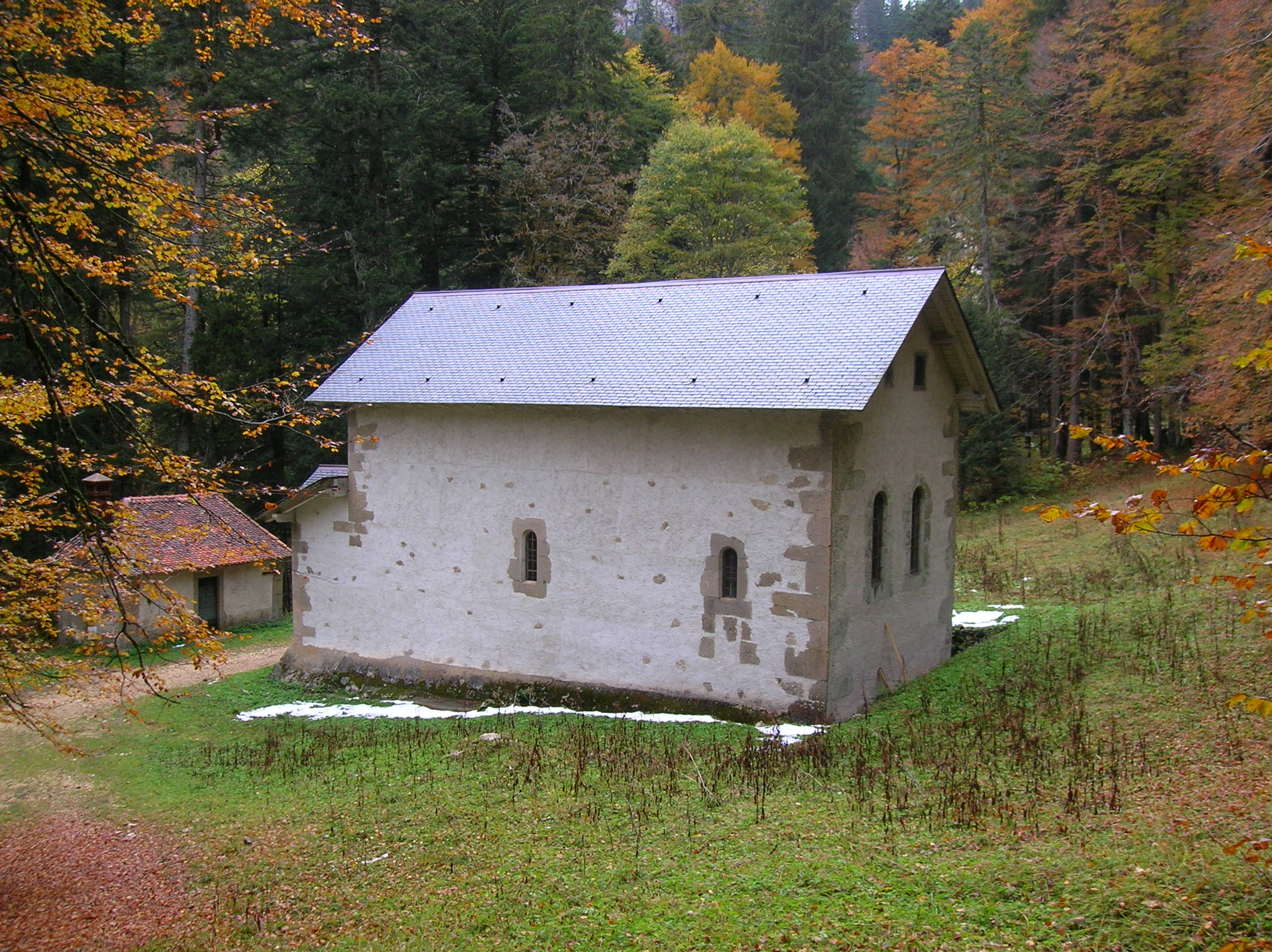
Notre Dame de Casalibus, Dauphiné

After his death, the Carthusians of Calabria, following a frequent custom of the Middle Ages, dispatched a roll-bearer, a servant of the community laden with a mortuary roll, a long roll of parchment, hung round his neck, who travelled through Italy, France, Germany, and England, stopping to announce the death of Bruno, and in return, the churches, communities, or chapters inscribed upon his roll, in prose or verse, the expression of their regrets, with promises of prayers. Many of these rolls have been preserved, but few are so extensive or so full of praise as those about Bruno. 178 witnesses, many of whom had known him, celebrated the extent of his knowledge and the fruitfulness of his instruction. Strangers to him were above all struck by his great knowledge and talents. His disciples praised his three chief virtues — his great spirit of prayer, extreme mortification, and devotion to the Blessed Virgin.

Both the churches built by him in the desert were dedicated to the Blessed Virgin: Our Lady of Casalibus in Dauphiné and Our Lady Della Torre in Calabria; faithful to his inspirations, the Carthusian Statutes proclaim the Mother of God the first and chief patron of all the houses of the order, whoever may be their particular patron. He is also the eponym for San Bruno Creek in California.

== Inscription in the Roman calendar ==
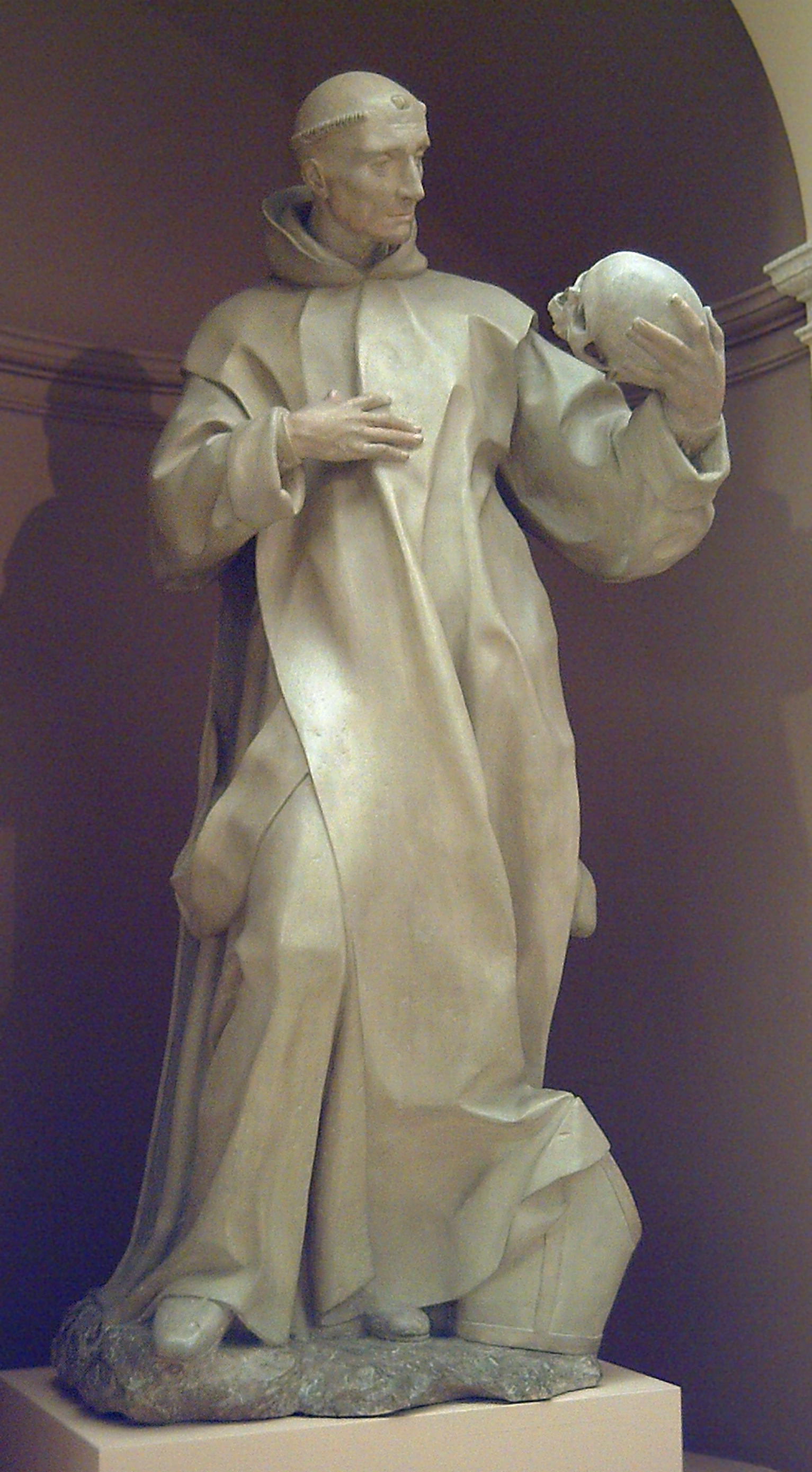
St Bruno, by Manuel Pereira (1652, Real Academia de Bellas Artes de San Fernando, Madrid).

Bruno was buried in the little cemetery of the hermitage of Santa Maria. In 1513, his bones were discovered with the epitaph "Haec sunt ossa magistri Brunonis" ('these are the bones of the master Bruno') over them. Since the Carthusian Order maintains a strict observance of humility, Saint Bruno was never formally canonised. He was not included in the Tridentine calendar, but in the year 1623, Pope Gregory XV included him in the General Roman Calendar for celebration on 6 October.

Saint Bruno has long been regarded as the patron saint of Calabria and one of the patron saints of Germany.

A writer as well as founder of his order, Bruno composed commentaries on the Psalms and on the Epistles of Paul the Apostle. Two letters of his also remain, his profession of faith, and a short elegy on contempt for the world, which shows that he cultivated poetry. Bruno's Commentaries reveal that he knew a little Hebrew and Greek; he was familiar with the Church Fathers, especially Augustine of Hippo and Ambrose. "His style", said Dom Rivet, "is concise, clear, nervous and simple, and his Latin as good as could be expected of that century: it would be difficult to find a composition of this kind at once more solid and more luminous, more concise and more clear."

In Catholic art, Saint Bruno can be recognised by a skull that he holds and contemplates, with a book and a cross. He may be crowned with a halo of seven stars; or with a roll bearing the device O Bonitas.

== See also ==
- Spatiamentum
- Cologne Charterhouse
- Chapel of Saint-Jean du Liget
