= Hugh of Die =

French Catholic bishop (c. 1040-1106)

- Church: Roman Catholic Church
- Appointed: October 19, 1073
- Term ended: October 7, 1106

Orders
- Ordination: (Priest)
- Consecration: March 9, 1074 (Bishop) by Pope Gregory VII

Personal details
- Born: c.1040 Romans-sur-Isère
- Died: 7 October 1106 (aged 65–66) Susa

Hugh of Die (c. 1040 – October 7, 1106) was a French Catholic bishop.

== Biography ==
Hugh was prior of the monastery of Saint-Marcel in Chalon-sur-Saône. On October 19, 1073, he became bishop of Die, Drôme and on March 9, 1074, received his episcopal consecration in Rome from the hands of Pope Gregory VII. Hugh was transferred to the metropolitan office of Archbishop of Lyon from 1081 to 1106 and was a strong supporter of the Gregorian reform and a papal legate.

In 1077, Hugh convened a synod at Autun. From this council numerous bishops and archbishops were removed or suspended from office, notably Manasses, archbishop of Reims, who was suspended for simony.

Hugh was excommunicated on August 29, 1087, at the Council of Benevento, for his criticisms of Pope Victor III's election. Victor's successor Pope Urban II revoked the provision and reinstated him in his offices, making him legate again in 1094. Hugh presided over a synod in Autun that issued measures against nicolaism, simony and Philip I of France's bigamous marriage. Consequently, Hugh excommunicated Philip for having married Bertrade de Montfort.

By the summer of 1100 Hugh had convened a synod at Anse, consisting of four archbishops and nine bishops, that circulated Pope Paschal II's crusading decree. With papal permission, he joined the Crusade of 1101 in return for an appointment as legate of Asia, while extracting a subsidy from his clergy. Hugh reached Jerusalem, without traveling with any of the large crusading armies.

== Sources ==
- Bradbury, Jim (2007). The Capetians: The History of a Dynasty. Bloomsbury Publishing.
- Cate, James Lea (1969). "The Crusade of 1101". In Setton, Kenneth M.; Baldwin, Marshall W. (eds.). A History of the Crusades. Vol. I: The First Hundred Years. The University of Wisconsin Press.
- Cowdrey, Herbert Edward John (1970). The Cluniacs and the Gregorian reform. Clarendon Press.
- Robinson, Ian Stuart (1978). Benson, Robert L. (ed.). "Periculosus homo: Pope Gregory VII and Episcopal Authority". Viator: Medieval and Renaissance Studies. 9. University of California Press: 103–132.
- Robinson, I.S. (1990). The Papacy: Continuity and Innovation, 1073-1198. Cambridge University Press.
