= Sennevières =

- Commune
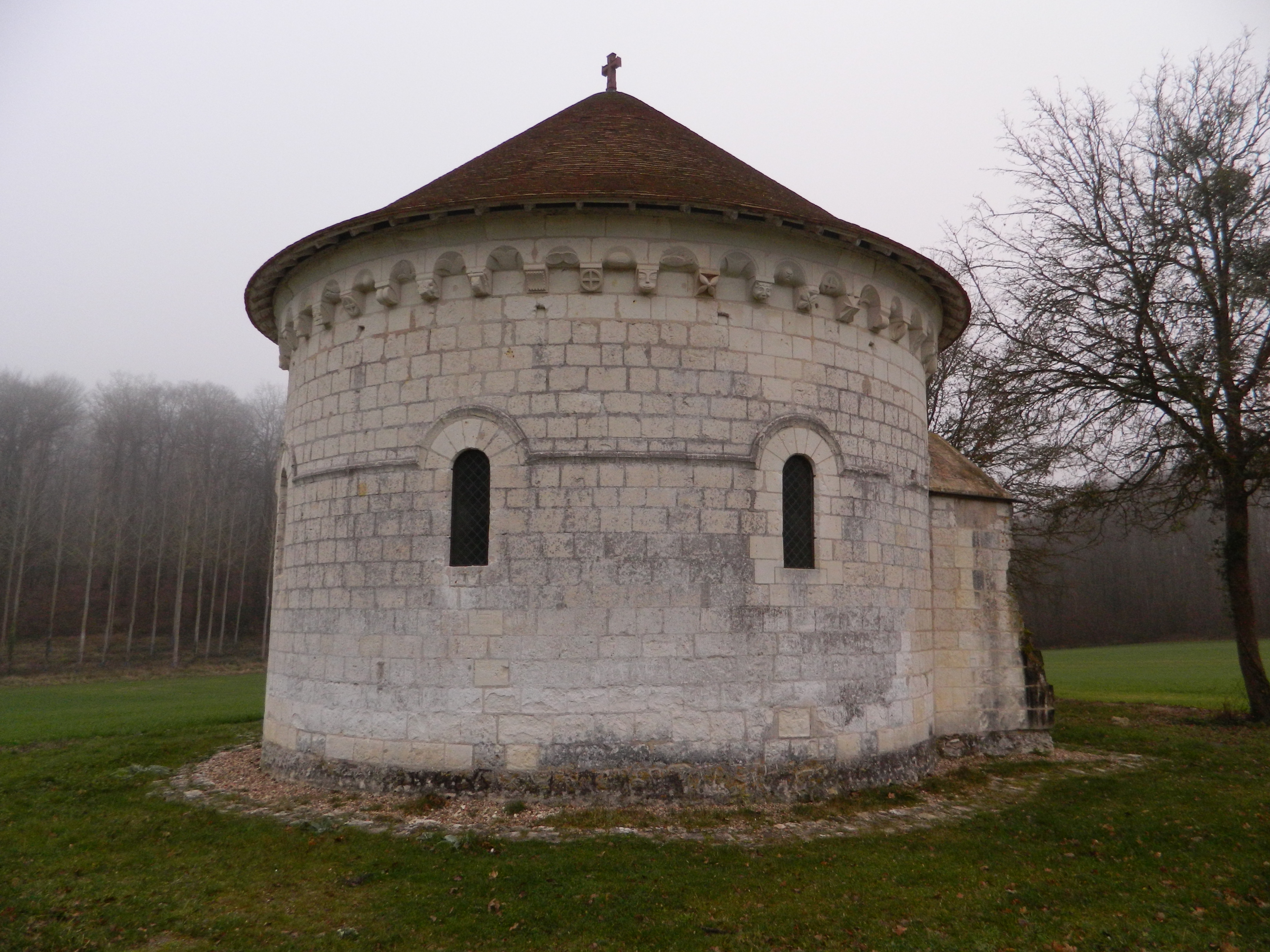
- The chapel of Saint-Jean of Liget
- Location of Sennevières
- Location within France Location within Centre-Val de Loire
- Coordinates: 47°06′23″N 1°06′07″E
- Country: France
- Region: Centre-Val de Loire
- Department: Indre-et-Loire
- Arrondissement: Loches
- Canton: Loches
- Intercommunality: CC Loches Sud Touraine

Government
  - Mayor (2020–2026): Caroline Krier
- Area^{1}: 23.54 km^{2} (9.09 sq mi)
- Highest elevation: 149 m (489 ft)
- Lowest elevation: 91 m (299 ft)
- Population (2023): 226
  - Density: 9.60/km^{2} (24.9/sq mi)
- Time zone: UTC+01:00 (CET)
  - Summer (DST): UTC+02:00 (CEST)
- INSEE/Postal code: 37246 /37600
- ^{1} French Land Register data, which excludes lakes, ponds, glaciers > 1 km^{2} (0.386 sq mi or 247 acres) and river estuaries.

Sennevières (French pronunciation: [sɛn(ə)vjɛʁ]) is a commune in the Indre-et-Loire department in central France.

== Population ==
Historical population
Year	Pop.	±% p.a.
1968	258	—
1975	207	−3.10%
1982	210	+0.21%
1990	225	+0.87%
1999	210	−0.76%
2007	226	+0.92%
2012	219	−0.63%
2017	209	−0.93%
2023	226	+1.31%
Source: INSEE

== See also ==
- Communes of the Indre-et-Loire department
- Chapel of Saint-Jean du Liget
