= Spatiamentum =

Weekly walk performed by Carthusian monks

A spatiamentum is weekly routine performed by Carthusian monks where they take an extended walk together lasting three or four hours. It is a complement to what is otherwise an extremely solitary life, as the monks mostly live a life of very strict enclosure, with most daily routines are conducted alone and in silence.

During the walk the monks talk freely, walking in pairs and changing partners every half-hour. This means that during a spatiamentum each monk will converse with eight others. This permits a fraternal sharing between the monks. Conversation during the walk is light-hearted and simple. The spatiamentum also provides physical space and exercise. In inclement weather, the walk is postponed to the next day.

The spatiamentum probably became a formal part of Carthusian life around the 12th century, in order to balance solitude with human contact, and provide some relaxation and respite from a strict rule and the focus on spiritual matters.

Dom Le Masson, the 18th-century prior general of the order, wrote, "It is only with the greatest reluctance that I grant leave from the spatiamentum, and then only to the aged. So great, it appears to me, is the utility of this walk for good of both body and soul. More easily and more willingly would I exempt a Carthusian monk from the Night Office, for some days, or from fasts of the Order, than from the spatiamentum."
