= Council of Benevento =

The Council of Benevento may mean one of a number of Councils, or more accurately in some cases synods, of the Roman Catholic Church.

- Synod of Benevento (1087): Pope Victor III condemned lay investiture.
- Council of Benevento (1091): Pope Urban II held councils at Melfi (1089), Benevento and Troia (1093).
- Synod of Benevento (1108), Synod of Benevento (1113), Synod of Benevento (1117): Pope Paschal II
- 1331
- 1513
